2018 in sports describes the year's events in world sport. The main events for this year were the 2018 Winter Olympics in Pyeongchang and the 2018 FIFA World Cup in Russia.

Calendar by month 

February 9 – Winter Olympics: Opening ceremony is performed in Pyeongchang County in South Korea.

Air sports

World Cups
Aeromodelling
 May 19 & 20: 2018 F3A Leiria World Cup in  Leiria

Parachuting
 January 12 – 14: 2018 Paraski World Cup Series #1 in  Bad Leonfelden
 Men's Individual winner:  Reinhold Haibel
 Women's Individual winner:  Magdalena Schwertl
 Mixed Team winners:  HSV Red Bull SBG 1 (Manuel Sulzbacher, Magdalena Schwertl, Julia Schosser, Sebastian Graser)
 Giant slalom winners:  Reinhold Haibel (m) /  Magdalena Schwertl (f)
 February 2 – 4: 2018 Paraski World Cup Series #2 in  Ponte di Legno
 Paraski Combi Men's winner:  Marco Valente
 Paraski Combi Women's winner:  Magdalena Schwertl
 Paraski Combi Junior winner:  Sebastian Graser
 Paraski Combi Master winner:  Marco Valente
 Mixed Team winners:  HSV Red Bull SBG 1 (Manuel Sulzbacher, Sebastian Graser, Magdalena Schwertl, Anton Gruber)
 Ski winners:  Sebastian Graser (m) /  Magdalena Schwertl (f)
 February 16 – 18: 2018 Paraski World Cup Series #3 in  Martin
 This event is cancelled.
 March 2 – 4: 2018 Paraski World Cup Series #4 (final) in  Vrchlabí
 Paraski Combi Men's winner:  Sebastian Graser
 Paraski Combi Women's winner:  Magdalena Schwertl
 Paraski Combi Junior winner:  Sebastian Graser
 Paraski Combi Master winner:  Marco Valente
 Mixed Team winners:  HSV Red Bull SBG 1 (Manuel Sulzbacher, Sebastian Graser, Magdalena Schwertl, Anton Gruber)
 Ski winners:  Sebastian Graser (m) /  Magdalena Schwertl (f)
 October 25 – 28: 3rd FAI World Cup of Indoor Skydiving in  Zallaq

World and Continental Championships
Aeromodelling
 March 19 – 22: 2018 FAI F1D World Championships for Free Flight Indoor Model Aircraft in  West Baden
 Seniors winner:  Brett Sanborn
 Juniors winner:  Vladyslav Klymenko
 Seniors Team winners:  (Brett Sanborn, Jake Palmer, John Kagan)
 Juniors Team winners:  (Eliott Crosnier, Timy Reveillon, Baptiste Rompion)
 May 5 – 13: 2018 FAI F3A Asian-Oceanic Championship for Aerobatic Model Aircraft in  Bacolod
 July 5 – 14: 2018 FAI F4 World Championships for Scale Model Aircraft in  Meiringen
 July 13 – 21: 2018 FAI F2 World Championships for Control Line Model Aircraft in  Landres
 July 15 – 21: 2018 FAI F3K European Championship for Model Gliders in  Martin
 July 21 – 28: 2018 FAI F3A European Championship for Aerobatic Model Aircraft in  Grandrieu
 July 22 – 28: 2018 FAI F3J World Championship for Model Gliders in  Brașov
 July 22 – 27: 2018 FAI F5 World Championships for Electric Model Aircraft in  Takikawa
 July 23 – 30: 2018 FAI F1 European Championships for Free Flight Model Aircraft in  Szentes
 August 5 – 11: 2018 FAI F1 Junior World Championships for Free Flight Model Aircraft in  Pazardzik
 August 19 – 25: 2018 FAI F5 European Championships for Electric Model Aircraft in  Dupnitsa
 August 25 – September 2: 2018 FAI S World Championships for Space Models in  Nowy Targ
 August 26 – 31: 2018 FAI F1E European Championships for Free Flight Model Aircraft in  Martin
 October 7 – 13: 2018 FAI F3 World Championship for Model Gliders in  Cape Arkona
 November 7 – 11: 2018 FAI World Drone Racing Championships in  Shenzhen

Ballooning
 February 15 – 22: 10th FAI World Hot Air Airship Championship in  Tegernsee
 Winners: 1st:  Andreas Merk, 2nd:  Ralph Kremer, 3rd:  Juergen Huetten
 August 7 – 11: 3rd FAI Women's World Hot Air Balloon Championship in  Nałęczów
 Winners: 1st:  Daria Dudkiewicz-Golawska, 2nd:  Agnė Simonavičiūtė, 3rd:  Nicola Scaife
 August 18 – 27: 23rd FAI World Hot Air Ballooning Championships in  Groß-Siegharts
 Winners: 1st:  Dominic Bareford, 2nd:  Stefan Zeberli, 3rd:  Sergey Latypov
 September 12 – 16: 4th FAI Junior World Hot Air Balloon Championship in  Włocławek

General aviation

2018 Red Bull Air Race World Championship
 February 2 & 3: Air Race #1 in  Abu Dhabi
 Winner:  Michael Goulian (Zivko Edge 540 V2)
 Challenger winner:  Florian Bergér
 April 21 & 22: Air Race #2 in  Cannes
 Winner:  Matt Hall (Zivko Edge 540 V3)
 Challenger winner:  Daniel Ryfa
 May 26 & 27: Air Race #3 in  Makuhari
 Winner:  Matt Hall (Zivko Edge 540 V3)
 Here challenger not hed.
 June 23 & 24: Air Race #4 in  Budapest
 Winner:  Martin Šonka (Zivko Edge 540 V3)
 Challenger winner:  Luke Czepiela
 August 4 & 5: Air Race #5 in  Makuhari
 August 26: Air Race #6 in  Kazan
 Winner:  Martin Šonka (Zivko Edge 540 V3)
 Challenger winner:  Kevin Coleman
 October 6 & 7: Air Race #7 in  Indianapolis
 Winner:  Michael Goulian (Zivko Edge 540 V2)
 Challenger winner:  Florian Bergér
 November 17 & 18 Air Race #8 (final) in  Fort Worth
 Winner:  Martin Šonka (Zivko Edge 540 V3)
 Challenger winner:  Luke Czepiela

World and Continental Championships
 August 5 – 11: 21st FAI World Rally Flying Championship in  Dubnica nad Váhom

Gliding
 July 8 – 21: 35th FAI World Gliding Championships in  Ostrów Wielkopolski
 July 28 – August 11: 35th FAI World Gliding Championships in  Příbram

Hang gliding
 July 8 – 21: 8th FAI World Hang Gliding Class 5 Championship in  Kruševo
 July 8 – 21: 20th FAI European Hang Gliding Class 1 Championship in  Kruševo

Microlights & Paramotors
 April 30 – May 6: 10th FAI World Paramotor Championships in  Lopburi
 PF1 winner:  Alexandre Mateos
 PL1 winner:  Wojciech Bógdał
 PL2 winners:  (Jean Mateos, Célia Domingues)
 PF1 Team winners: 
 PL1 Team winners: 
 PL2 Team winners: 
 October 30 – November 6: 3rd FAI World Paramotor Slalom Championships in  Byoum Lakeside

Parachuting
 April 3 – 8: 1st CISM Para-Ski World Championship in  Hochfilzen
 Cross-Country Skiing winners:  Dario Cologna (m) /  Stefanie Böhler (f)
 Cross-Country Skiing Teams winners:  (Dario Cologna, Beda Klee, Jonas Baumann) (m) /  (Stefanie Böhler, Theresa Eichhorn, Antonia Fräbel)
 Patrol winners:  (Bernhard Tritscher, Sven Grossegger, Dominik Landertinger, Simon Eder (m) /  (Barbara Walchhofer, Julia Schwaiger, Lisa Hauser, Katharina Innerhofer)
 Biathlon winners:  Benjamin Weger (m) /  Franziska Hildebrand (f)
 Biathlon Teams winners:  (Dominik Landertinger, Simon Eder, Sven Grossegger) (m) /  (Lisa Hauser, Julia Schwaiger, Dunja Zdouc)
 Paraski winners:  Sebastian Graser (m) /  Julia Schosser (f)
 Paraski Team winners:  (Hannes Kloiber, Sebastian Graser, Manuel Sulzbacher, Julia Schosser)
 Juniors winner:  Sebastian Graser
 Giant Slalom winners:  Štefan Hadalin (m) /  Elisabeth Kappaurer (f)
 Giant Slalom Teams winners:  (Bastian Meisen, Julian Rauchfuss, Sebastian Holzmann, Paul Sauter) (m) /  (Elisabeth Kappaurer, Elisabeth Reisinger, Stephanie Resch)
 April 11 – 14: 1st FAI European Indoor Skydiving Championships in  Voss
Artistic Events Indoor Freestyle
 Junior winners: 1st: , 2nd: , 3rd:  2
 Open winners: 1st: , 2nd: , 3rd: 
Dynamic 2-Way and 4-Way
 Dynamic 2-Way winners: 1st:  1, 2nd:  1, 3rd:  2
 Dynamic 4-Way winners: 1st: , 2nd: , 3rd: 
Formation Skydiving 4-Way
 Open winners: 1st: , 2nd: , 3rd: 
 Junior winners: 1st: , 2nd: , 3rd: 
 Women's winners: 1st: , 2nd: , 3rd: 
Vertical Formation Skydiving
 Open winners: 1st: , 2nd: , 3rd: 
 July 3 – 7: 7th FAI World Canopy Piloting Championships in  Wrocław
 August 10 – 21: 42nd CISM World Military Parachuting Championship in  Szolnok
 August 25 – 30: 35th FAI World Freefall Style and Accuracy Landing Championships in  Montana
 August 25 – 30: 9th FAI Junior World Freefall Style and Accuracy Landing Championships in  Montana
 August 26 – 31: 2nd FAI World Wingsuit Flying Championships in  Prostějov
 Performance Wingsuit Flying winners: 4.  Espen Fadnes, 2.  Chris Geiler, 3.  Dmitry Podoryashy
 Wingsuit Acrobatic Flying winners: 1.  1, 2. , 3.  2
 October 6 – 13: 18th FAI World Canopy Formation Championships in  Gold Coast
 October 6 – 13: 23rd FAI World Formation Skydiving Championships in  Gold Coast
 October 6 – 13: 2nd FAI World Speed Skydiving Championships in  Gold Coast
 October 6 – 13: 12th FAI World Artistic Events championships in  Gold Coast

Paragliding
 March 30 – April 7: 3rd FAI Pan-American Paragliding Championship in  Baixo Guandu
 Men's Individual winners: 1st:  Jeison Zeferino Brito, 2nd:  Leandro Henrique Padua, 3rd:  Michel Guillemot
 Team winners: 1st: , 2nd: , 3rd: 
 Women's winners: 1st:  Priscila Fevereiro, 2nd:  Andrea Jaramillo Jaramillo, 3rd:  Shauin Kao
 April 6 – 12: 1st FAI Asian-Oceanic Paragliding Accuracy Championships in  Lopburi
 Individual R11 winners: 1st:  Jianwei Wang, 2nd:  Tanapat Luangiam, 3rd:  Hongji Wang
 Team R11 winners: 1st: , 2nd: , 3rd: 
 Women's winners: 1st:  Chantika Chaisanuk, 2nd:  Jingwen Long, 3rd:  Nunnapat Phuchong
 July 14 – 28: 15th FAI European Paragliding Championship in  Montalegre
 Overall winner:  Theo Warden
 Women's winner:  Seiko Fukuoka Naville
 Teams winners:  (Xevi Bonet Dalmau, Sergi Claret Estupinya, Felix Rodriguez Fernández, Francisco Javier Reina)
 September 16 – 22: 6th FAI European Paragliding Accuracy Championship in  Kobarid

Power and Glider aerobatics
 August 3 – 12: 21st FAI World Glider Aerobatic Championships in  Zbraslavice
 Individual Unlimited winner:  Ferenc Tóth
 Team Unlimited winners:  (Moritz Kirchberg, Eugen Schaal, Eberhard Holl)
 August 3 – 12: 9th FAI World Advanced Glider Aerobatic Championships in  Zbraslavice
 Individual Advanced winner:  Jonas Langenegger
 Team Advanced winners:  (Tomáš Bartoň, Josef Rejent, Aleš Ferra)
 August 16 – 26: 13th FAI World Advanced Aerobatic Championships in  Strejnicu
 Free Known winner:  Dmitry Samokhvalov
 Free Unknown ~1 winner:  Roman Ovchinnikov
 Free Unknown ~2 winner:  Aaron McCartan
 Free Unknown ~3 winner:  Roman Ovchinnikov
 Team winners: 
 Individual winners:  Roman Ovchinnikov
 September 8 – 15: 21st FAI European Aerobatic Championships in  Jindřichův Hradec

Rotorcraft
 July 24 – 29: 16th FAI World Helicopter Championship in  Minsk
 Navigation winners:  (Marcin Szamborski & Michał Szamborski)
 Parallel Precision Flying winners:  (Andrey Orekhov & Vadim Sazonov)
 Parallel Fender Rigging winners:  (Uladzimir Buhayeu & Andrei Rogonov)
 Parallel Slalom winners:  (Maxim Sotnikov & Aleh Puajukas)
 Team Overall winners:

Alpine skiing

Amateur boxing

American football

 Super Bowl LII – the Philadelphia Eagles (NFC) won 41–33 over the New England Patriots (AFC)
Location: U.S. Bank Stadium
Attendance: 67,612
MVP: Nick Foles, QB (Philadelphia)

Aquatics

Archery

2017–18 Indoor Archery World Cup & World Championships
 November 10 – 12, 2017: IA World Cup #1 in  Marrakesh
 Recurve winners:  Matteo Fissore (m) /  Aída Román (f)
 Compound winners:  Braden Gellenthien (m) /  Sarah Prieels (f)
 Junior Recurve winners:  Jonah Wilthagen (m) /  Lena Agerholm (f)
 Women's Junior Compound winner:  Dalila-Warda Amani
 December 2 & 3, 2017: IA World Cup #2 in  Bangkok
 Recurve winners:  Kim Bong-man (m) /  SIM Ye-ji (f)
 Compound winners:  Mike Schloesser (m) /  Paige Pearce-Gore (f)
 January 19 – 21: IA World Cup #3 in  Nîmes
 Recurve winners:  Steve Wijler (m) /  KIM Su-rin (f)
 Compound winners:  Kristofer Schaff (m) /  Natalie Avdeeva (f)
 February 9 & 10: IA World Cup #4 (final) in  Las Vegas
 Recurve winners:  Steve Wijler (m) /  Lisa Unruh (f)
 Compound winners:  Jesse Broadwater (m) /  Danielle Reynolds (f)
 February 14 – 19: 2018 World Indoor Archery Championships in  Yankton, South Dakota
 Recurve winners:  Sjef van den Berg (m) /  Elena Richter (f)
 Junior Recurve winners:  Ivan Kozhokar (m) /  Ariuna Budaeva (f)
 Compound winners:  Mike Schloesser (m) /  Natalia Avdeeva (f)
 Junior Compound winners:  Simon Olsen (m) /  Cassidy Cox (f)
 Team Recurve winners:  (m) /  (f)
 Junior Team Recurve winners:  (m) /  (f)
 Team Compound winners:  (m) /  (f)
 Junior Team Compound winners:  (m) /  (f)

2018 Outdoor Archery World Cup, Continental, & World Championships
 April 24 – 29: WA World Cup #1 in  Shanghai
 Recurve winners:  Kim Woo-jin (m) /  Chang Hye-jin (f)
 Compound winners:  KIM Jong-ho (m) /  Sara López (f)
 Team Recurve winners:  (m) /  (f)
 Team Compound winners:  (m) /  (f)
 Mixed winners:  (Recurve) /  (Compound)
 May 20 – 26: WA World Cup #2 in  Antalya
 Recurve winners:  Lee Woo-seok (m) /  Ksenia Perova (f)
 Compound winners:  Mike Schloesser (m) /  Yeşim Bostan (f)
 Team Recurve winners:  (m) /  (f)
 Team Compound winners:  (m) /  (f)
 Mixed winners:  (Recurve) /  (Compound)
 June 19 – 24: WA World Cup #3 in  Salt Lake City
 Recurve winners:  Mauro Nespoli (m) /  Deepika Kumari (f)
 Compound winners:  Stephan Hansen (m) /  Sara López (f)
 Team Recurve winners:  (m) /  (f)
 Team Compound winners:  (m) /  (f)
 Mixed winners:  (Recurve) /  (Compound)
 July 16 – 22: WA World Cup #4 in  Berlin
 Recurve winners:  Mete Gazoz (m) /  Lee Eun-kyung (f)
 Compound winners:  Mike Schloesser (m) /  Sophie Dodemont (f)
 Team Recurve winners:  (m) /  (f)
 Team Compound winners:  (m) /  (f)
 Mixed winners:  (Recurve) /  (Compound)
 August 14 – 19: 2018 Pan American Archery Championships in  Medellín
 Recurve winners:  Ernesto Boardman (m) /  Alejandra Valencia (f)
 Compound winners:  Antonio Hidalgo (m) /  Sara López (f)
 Team Recurve winners:  (m) /  (f)
 Team Compound winners:  (m) /  (f)
 Mixed winners:  (Recurve) /  (Compound)
 August 27 – September 1: 2018 European Archery Championships in  Legnica
 Recurve winners:  Steve Wijler (m) /  Yasemin Anagöz (f)
 Compound winners:  Anton Bulaev (m) /  Andrea Marcos (f)
 Team Recurve winners:  (m) /  (f)
 Team Compound winners:  (m) /  (f)
 Mixed winners:  (Recurve) /  (Compound) 
 September 4 – 9: 2018 World Field Archery Championships in  Cortina d'Ampezzo
 Recurve winners:  Wataru Oonuki (m) /  Lisa Unruh (f)
 Compound winners:  Mike Schloesser (m) /  Paige Pearce (f)
 Barebow winners:  Erik Jonsson (m) /  Lina Bjorklund (f)
 Junior Recurve winners:  William Pike (m) /  Aiko Rolando (f)
 Junior Compound winners:  Timo Bega (m) /  Sara Ret (f)
 Junior Barebow winners:  Eric Esposito (m) /  Natalia Trunfio (f)
 Team winners:  (m) /  (f)
 Junior Team winners:  (m) /  (f)
 September 29 & 30: WA World Cup #5 (final) in  Samsun
 Recurve winners:  Kim Woo-jin (m) /  Lee Eun-kyung (f)
 Compound winners:  Kris Schaff (m) /  Sara López (f)
 Mixed Team winners:  (Recurve) /  (Compound)

Association football

Athletics (track and field)

Badminton

Bandy

Baseball

Major League Baseball
 March 29 – September 30: 2018 Major League Baseball season
 American League 2018 Season winners:  Boston Red Sox
 National League 2018 Season winners:  Los Angeles Dodgers
 June 4 – 6: 2018 Major League Baseball draft in  Secaucus, New Jersey
 #1 pick:  Casey Mize (to the  Detroit Tigers from the  Auburn Tigers)
 July 17: 2018 Major League Baseball All-Star Game in  Washington D.C. at Nationals Park
 The American League defeated the National League, 8–6.
 MVP:  Alex Bregman ( Houston Astros)
 2018 Major League Baseball Home Run Derby Winner:  Bryce Harper ( Washington Nationals)
 October 23 – 28: 2018 World Series
 The  Boston Red Sox defeated the  Los Angeles Dodgers, 4–1 in games played, to win their ninth World Series title.

2018 Little League Baseball World Series
 July 28 – August 4: 2018 Senior League Baseball World Series in  Easley at Easley Recreation Complex
 The  Pariba Little League (Caribbean) defeated the  Naamans Little League (East), 7–2, in the final.
 July 29 – August 5: 2018 Little League Intermediate (50/70) Baseball World Series in  Livermore at Max Baer Park
 The  West Seoul LL (Asia-Pacific) defeated the  Livermore/Granada LL (Host), 10–0, in the final.
 August 12 – 19: 2018 Junior League World Series in  Taylor at Heritage Park
 The  Shing-Ming Junior LL (Asia-Pacific) defeated the  Lufkin LL (Southwest), 2–0, in the final.
 August 16 – 26: 2018 Little League World Series in  South Williamsport at both the Little League Volunteer Stadium and the Howard J. Lamade Stadium
 The  Honolulu LL (West) defeated the  South Seoul LL (Asia-Pacific and Middle East), 3–0, in the final.

Baseball world events
 July 6 – 15: 2018 World University Baseball Championship in  Chiayi
  defeated , 8–3, in the final.  took third place.
 August 10 – 19: 2018 U-15 Baseball World Cup in  David & Chitré
  defeated , 7–1, to win their sixth U-15 Baseball World Cup title.
  took third place.
 August 22 – 31: 2018 Women's Baseball World Cup in  Viera, Florida
  defeated , 6–0, to win their sixth consecutive Women's Baseball World Cup title.
  took third place.
 October 19 – 28: 2018 U-23 Baseball World Cup in  Barranquilla & Montería
  defeated , 2–1, to win their first U–23 Baseball World Cup title.
  took third place.

Basketball

FIBA World events
 June 8 – 12: 2018 FIBA 3x3 World Cup in  Bocaue
 Team winners:  (m) /  (f)
 Skills Contest winner:  Alexandra Theodorean
 Dunk Contest winner:  Dmytro Krivenko
 Shoot-out Contest winner:  Janine Pontejos
 June 30 – July 8: 2018 FIBA Under-17 Basketball World Cup in  Rosario and Santa Fe
 The  defeated , 95–52, to win their fifth consecutive FIBA Under-17 Basketball World Cup title.
  took third place.
 July 21 – 29: 2018 FIBA Under-17 Women's Basketball World Cup in  Minsk
 The  defeated , 92–40, to win their fourth FIBA Under-17 Women's Basketball World Cup title.
  took third place.
 September 22 – 30: 2018 FIBA Women's Basketball World Cup in  Tenerife
 The  defeated , 73–56, to win their third consecutive and tenth overall FIBA Women's Basketball World Cup title.
  took third place.

National Basketball Association
October 17, 2017 – April 11, 2018: 2017–18 NBA season
 The  Toronto Raptors clinched home court advantage for the Eastern Conference playoffs.
 The  Houston Rockets clinched home court advantage for the entire playoffs.
 Top Scorer:  James Harden (Houston Rockets)
February 18: 2018 NBA All-Star Game at the Staples Center in  Los Angeles
 All-Star Game: Team LeBron defeated Team Stephen, 148–145.
 MVP:  LeBron James ( Cleveland Cavaliers)
 NBA All-Star Weekend Celebrity Game: Team Clippers defeated Team Lakers, 75–66.
 Rising Stars Challenge:  Team World defeated  Team USA, 155–124.
 NBA All-Star Weekend Skills Challenge winner:  Spencer Dinwiddie ( Brooklyn Nets)
 Three-Point Contest winner:  Devin Booker ( Phoenix Suns)
 Slam Dunk Contest winner:  Donovan Mitchell ( Utah Jazz)
April 14 – June 8: 2018 NBA Playoffs
 The  Golden State Warriors defeated the  Cleveland Cavaliers, 4–0 in games played, to win their third of four consecutive and sixth overall NBA title.
June 21: 2018 NBA draft in  Brooklyn at Barclays Center
 #1:  Deandre Ayton (to the  Phoenix Suns from the  Arizona Wildcats)

Women's National Basketball Association
 April 12: 2018 WNBA draft in  Nike New York Headquarters (New York City)
 #1 pick:  A'ja Wilson to the  Las Vegas Aces from the  South Carolina Gamecocks
 May 18 – August 19: 2018 WNBA season
 Western Conference winners:  Seattle Storm
 Eastern Conference winners:  Atlanta Dream
 MVP:  Breanna Stewart ( Seattle Storm)
 July 28: 2018 WNBA All-Star Game in  Minneapolis at Target Center
 Team Parker defeated Team Delle Donne, 119–112.
 MVP:  Maya Moore ( Minnesota Lynx)
 Three Point Shootout winner:  Allie Quigley ( Chicago Sky)
 August 21 – September 12: 2018 WNBA Playoffs
 The  Seattle Storm defeated the  Washington Mystics, 3–0 in games played, to win their third WNBA title.

National Collegiate Athletic Association
 March 13 – April 2: 2018 NCAA Division I men's basketball tournament
 The  Villanova Wildcats defeated the  Michigan Wolverines 79–62 to win their second NCAA title in three years and third overall.
 March 16 – April 1: 2018 NCAA Division I women's basketball tournament
 The  Notre Dame Fighting Irish defeated the  Mississippi State Bulldogs 61–58 to win their second NCAA title.

2018 FIBA 3x3 World Tour
 July 21 & 22: Saskatoon Masters in 
  Novi Sad defeated fellow Serbian team, Liman, 20–18, in the final.
 July 28 & 29: Utsunomiya Masters in 
  Liman defeated  Amsterdam, 18–11, in the final.
 August 4 & 5: Prague Masters in the 
  Novi Sad defeated  Gagarin, 21–12, in the final.
 August 24 & 25: Lausanne Masters in 
  Novi Sad defeated fellow Serbian team, Liman, 21–20, in the final.
 August 30 & 31: Debrecen Masters in 
  Novi Sad defeated  Riga, 21–10, in the final.
 September 8 & 9: Mexico City Masters in 
  Ljubljana defeated  Ponce, 21–17, in the final.
 September 22 & 23: Hyderabad Masters in 
  Novi Sad defeated fellow Serbian team, Liman, 21–16, in the final.
 September 29 & 30: Chengdu Masters in 
  Liman defeated  Riga, 21–12, in the final.
 October 13 & 14: Penang Masters in 
  Liman defeated  Piran, 21–15, in the final.
 October 27 & 28: Beijing Masters (final) in 
  Novi Sad defeated  Riga, 20–18, in the final.

FIBA Americas
 January 19 – March 25: 2018 FIBA Americas League
  San Lorenzo defeated  Mogi das Cruzes, 79–71, to win their first FIBA Americas League title.
  Regatas Corrientes took third place.
 June 11 – 16: 2018 FIBA Under-18 Americas Championship in  St. Catharines
 The  defeated , 113–74, to win their fifth consecutive and ninth overall FIBA Under-18 Americas Championship title.
  took third place.
 August 1 – 7: 2018 FIBA Under-18 Women's Americas Championship in  Mexico City
 The  defeated , 84–60, to win their ninth consecutive and tenth overall FIBA Under-18 Women's Americas Championship title.
  took third place.

FIBA Europe

2018 European Championships
 June 26 – July 1: 2018 FIBA European Championship for Small Countries in  Serravalle
  defeated , 76–59, to win their first FIBA European Championship for Small Countries title.
  took third place.
 June 26 – July 1: 2018 FIBA Women's European Championship for Small Countries in  Cork
  defeated , 93–59, in the final.  took third place.
 July 7 – 15: 2018 FIBA Europe Under-20 Championship for Women in  Sopron
  defeated , 69–50, to win their fourth consecutive and eighth overall FIBA Europe Under-20 Championship for Women title.
  took third place.
 July 14 – 22: 2018 FIBA Europe Under-20 Championship in  Chemnitz
  defeated , 80–66, to win their first FIBA Europe Under-20 Championship title.
  took third place.
 July 28 – August 5: 2018 FIBA Europe Under-18 Championship in  Ventspils, Liepāja, & Riga
  defeated , 99–90, to win their second consecutive and fourth overall FIBA Europe Under-18 Championship title.
  took third place.
 August 4 – 12: 2018 FIBA Under-18 Women's European Championship in  Udine
  defeated , 67–54, to win their first FIBA Under-18 Women's European Championship title.
  took third place.
 August 10 – 18: 2018 FIBA Europe Under-16 Championship in  Novi Sad
  defeated , 71–70, to win their fourth FIBA Europe Under-16 Championship title.
  took third place.
 August 17 – 25: 2018 FIBA Europe Under-16 Championship for Women in  Kaunas
  took third place.
 August 31 – September 2: 2018 FIBA Europe Under-18 3x3 Championships in  Debrecen
 Men:  defeated , 20–18, to win their first Men's FIBA Europe Under-18 3x3 Championships title.
  took third place.
 Women:  defeated , 12–4, to win their first Women's FIBA Europe Under-18 3x3 Championships title.
  took third place.
 September 14 – 16: 2018 FIBA 3x3 Europe Cup in  Bucharest
 Men:  defeated , 19–18, to win their first Men's FIBA 3x3 Europe Cup title.
  took third place.
 Women:  defeated , 21–5, to win their first Women's FIBA 3x3 Europe Cup title.
  took third place.

2017–18 European Leagues
 September 15, 2017 – April 3: 2017–18 Alpe Adria Cup
  KK Zlatorog Laško defeated  Levicki Patrioti 89–79 to win their first Alpe Adria Cup title.
 September 19, 2017 – May 6: 2017–18 Basketball Champions League
  AEK Athens defeated  Monaco 100–94 to win their first Basketball Champions League title.
  UCAM Murcia took third place.
 September 20, 2017 – April 18: 2017–18 EuroCup Women
  Galatasaray defeated  Umana Reyer Venezia 155–140 in the two-legged final to win their second EuroCup Women title.
 September 20, 2017 – May 2: 2017–18 FIBA Europe Cup
  Umana Reyer Venezia defeated fellow Italian team Sidigas Avellino 158–148 in the two-legged final to win their first FIBA Europe Cup title.
 September 26, 2017 – April 22: 2017–18 EuroLeague Women
  UMMC Ekaterinburg defeated  Sopron Basket 72–53 to win their fourth EuroLeague Women title.
  Dynamo Kursk took third place.
 October 4, 2017 – March 25: 2017–18 WABA League
  Budućnost Bemax defeated  Athlete Celje, 71–68, to win their second WABA League title.
  WBC Montana 2003 took third place.
 October 10, 2017 – April 4: 2017–18 ABA League Second Division (debut event)
  KK Krka defeated fellow Slovenian team, KK Primorska, 87–73, to win the inaugural ABA League Second Division title.
 October 10, 2017 – April 15: 2017–18 BIBL season
  Levski defeated  Bashkimi, 83–72, to win their third BIBL title.
  BC Rilski Sportist took third place.
 October 10, 2017 – April 16: 2017–18 EuroCup Basketball
  Darüşşafaka S.K. defeated  PBC Lokomotiv Kuban, 148–137 in two matches, to win their first EuroCup Basketball title.
 October 12, 2017 – May 20: 2017–18 EuroLeague (Final Four in  Belgrade)
  Real Madrid defeated  Fenerbahçe Doğuş, 85–80, to win their tenth EuroLeague title.
  BC Žalgiris took third place.
 October 18, 2017 – March 4: 2017–18 Central Europe Women's League
  BC Pharmaserv Marburg defeated  CSM Satu Mare, 69–60, to win their first Central Europe Women's League title.
  Olimpia CSU Brașov took third place.
 October 24, 2017 – April 5: 2017–18 Baltic Basketball League
  BC Pieno žvaigždės defeated  BK Jūrmala, 174–148 in the final's two legs, to win their first Baltic Basketball League title.
  BC Tartu took third place.

FIBA Asia
National teams
 April 29 – May 1: 2018 FIBA 3x3 Asia Cup in  Shenzhen
 Men:  defeated , 17–16, in the final.  took third place.
 Women:  defeated , 14–11, in the final.  took third place.
 August 5 – 11: 2018 FIBA Under-18 Asian Championship in 
 In the final,  defeated , 73–62, to win their 1st title.
  took third place.
 Note: All teams mentioned here, plus , have qualified to compete at the 2019 FIBA Under-19 Basketball World Cup.
 October 28 – November 3: 2018 FIBA Under-18 Women's Asian Championship in  Bangalore
  defeated , 89–76, to win their fifth consecutive and 16th overall FIBA Under-18 Women's Asian Championship title.
  took third place.
 Note: All teams mentioned here, plus , have qualified to compete at the 2019 FIBA Under-19 Women's Basketball World Cup.

Clubs teams
 November 17, 2017 – May 2: 2017–18 ABL season
  San Miguel Alab Pilipinas defeated  Mono Vampire, 3–2 in games played in a 5-legged final, to win their first ABL title.
 July 17 – 22: Summer Super 8 in 
  Guangzhou Long-Lions defeated  Seoul Samsung Thunders, 78–72, to win their first title.
  Incheon Electroland Elephants took third place.

FIBA Africa
 August 10 – 19: 2018 FIBA Under-18 Women's African Championship in  Maputo
  defeated , 86–33, to win their third consecutive and seventh overall FIBA Under-18 Women's African Championship title.
  took third place.
 August 24 – September 2: 2018 FIBA Under-18 African Championship in  Bamako
  defeated , 78–76, to win their first FIBA Africa Under-18 Championship title.
  took third place.

FIBA Oceania
 December 2 – 8: 2018 FIBA U15 Oceania Championship for Men & Women in  Port Moresby
 Men:  defeated , 61–58, in the final.  took third place.
 Women:  defeated , 110–30, in the final.  took third place.

Beach soccer

Beach tennis

Beach volleyball

Biathlon

Bobsleigh & Skeleton

Bowling

Bowls

World Tour 
 November 4 – 11, 2017: The Co-op Funeralcare Scottish International Open 2017 in  Perth, Scotland
 In the final,  David Gourlay defeated  Michael Stepney, 7,11 – 4,9.
 January 12 – 28: 2018 World Indoor Bowls Championship in  Hopton-on-Sea
 Open Singles:  Mark Dawes defeated  Robert Paxton, 8–7, 6–7, 2–0.
 Women's singles:  Katherine Rednall defeated  Rebecca Field, 13–6, 13–6.
 Open Pairs:  Jamie Chestney &  Mark Dawes defeated  Nick Brett &  Greg Harlow, 6–6, 9–5.
 Mixed Pairs:  Jamie Chestney &  Lesley Doig defeated  Darren Burnett &  Rebecca Field, 8–4, 7–6.
 March 3 – 9: The Co-op Funeralcare International Open 2018 in  Blackpool
 In the final,  David Gourlay defeated  Greg Harlow, 11,9 – 5,9, 2–1.
 The Co-op Funeralcare European Masters 2018

World Cup
 March 6 – 14: 2018 World Cup in

World and International Championships
 February 24 – March 2: World Youth Bowls Championships in  Broadbeach
 Men's:  1 defeated , 21–12.
 Women's:  2 defeated  1, 21–13.
 Mixed Pairs:  1 defeated  Norfolk Island & , 20–5.
 October 28 – November 4: World Singles Champion of Champions in  St Johns Park, New South Wales
 Men's:  Shannon McIlroy defeated  Tony Cheung, 8–3, 9–2.
 Women's:  Jo Edwards defeated  Alyani Jamil, 10–7, 10–3.

Bridge

Europe
 February 2 – 4: 7th International Barcelona Bridge Open in  Barcelona
 Winners:  Antonio Palma &  Massimiliano Di Franco
 February 17 – 23: 2nd European Winter Games in  Monte Carlo
 Winners:  Team Mahaffey (Boye Brogeland, Espen Lindqvist, Zia Mahmood, Jeff Meckstroth)
 March 2 – 4: Slava Cup in  Moscow
 Winners:  Diyan Danailov &  Rossen Gunev
 June 6 – 16: 54th European Team Championships in  Ostend
 July 11 – 18: 14th Youth Pairs Championships in  Opatija

Asia-Pacific
 April 14 – 20: 2018 APBF Open Youth Championships in  Jakarta
 U26 winners:  Airlangga University
 U21 winners:  High School Affiliated to Renmin University of China
 June 4 – 10: 3rd Asia Cup Bridge Championships in  Goa

Other in Bridge
 May 10 – 23: 68th South American Bridge Festival in  Comandatuba
 August 9 – 18: 17th World Youth Bridge Team Championships in  Wujiang
 September 22 – October 6: 11th World Bridge Series in  Orlando
 October 25 – 28: 9th World University Bridge Championship in  Suzhou

Canadian football
November 25 – 106th Grey Cup: Calgary Stampeders defeat Ottawa Redblacks, 27–16.

Canoeing

Cheerleading

Open
 January 27 & 28: Winter Open in  Drammen
 For all results, click here.  and here.

World and Continental Championships
 April 25 – 27: 2018 Junior World Cheerleading Championships and World Cheerleading Championships in  Orlando
  won both the gold and overall medal tallies.
 June 30 & July 1: ECU European Cheerleading Championships in  Helsinki
 October 5 & 6: 1st World University Cheerleading Championships in  Łódź

Chess

World Events
 March 10 – 28: Candidates Tournament 2018 in  Berlin
 Winner:  Fabiano Caruana
 April 20 – 29: World Schools Individual Championships 2018 in  Durrës
 U7 winners:  Dinmukhammed Tulendinov (m) /  Lakshana Subramanian (f)
 U9 winners:  Savva Vetokhin (m) /  Alserkal Rouda Essa (f)
 U11 winners:  Lkhagvajamts Ochirbat (m) /  Alua Nurmanova (f)
 U13 winners:  Momchil Petkov (m) /  Davaakhuu Munkhzul (f)
 U15 winners:  Arystan Isanzhulov (m) /  Nazerke Nurgali (f)
 U17 winners:  Murad Ibrahimli (m) /  Viktoria Radeva (f)
 April 21 – 30: 2018 World Amateur Chess Championship in  Cagliari
 Under2300 winner:  Arvinder Preet Singh
 Under2000 winner:  Kanan Hajiyev
 Under1700 winners:  Batuhan Sütbaş (m) /  Vilena Popova (f)
 May 2 – May 20: Women's World Chess Championship Match 2018 in  Chongqing and  Shanghai
 Winner:  Ju Wenjun
 June 21 – 25: 2018 World Cadets U8, U10, U12 Rapid & Blitz Chess Championships in  Minsk
 Blitz U8 winners:  Khumoyun Begmuratov (m) /  Ekaterina Zubkovskaya (f)
 Blitz U10 winners:  Tykhon Cherniaiev (m) /  Afruza Khamdamova (f)
 Blitz U12 winners:  Leonid Girshgorn (m) /  Umida Omonova (f)
 Rapid U8 winners:  Khumoyun Begmuratov (m) /  Varvara Kuzmina (f)
 Rapid U10 winners:  Tykhon Cherniaiev (m) /  Samantha Edithso (f)
 Rapid U12 winners:  Bardiya Daneshvar (m) /  Umida Omonova (f)
 July 7 – 15: 2018 World Team Chess Championship 50+, 65+ in  Radebeul
 September 4 – 16: World Junior Chess Championship and Girls U20 in  Gebze
 Winners:  Parham Maghsoodloo (m) /  Aleksandra Maltsevskaya (f)
 September 23 – October 6: 43rd Chess Olympiad in  Batumi
 October 19 – November 1: 2018 World Youth U14, U16, U18 Championships in  Chalkidiki
 November 3 – 16: 2018 World Cadets U8, U10, U12 Championships in  Santiago de Compostela
 November 9 – 28: World Chess Championship 2018 in  London
 Winner:  Magnus Carlsen
 November 17 – 30: 2018 World Senior Chess Championship in  Bled
 65+ Winners:  Vlastimil Jansa (m) /  Nona Gaprindashvili (f)
 50+ Winners:  Karen Movsziszian (m) /  Elvira Berend (f)
 November 24 – December 3: 2018 World Youth U-16 Chess Olympiad in  Manavgat
 Winner:  Uzbekistan
 Women's World Chess Championship 2018 in  Khanty-Mansiysk
 Winner:  Ju Wenjun
 World Cities Team Championship 2018 in

European Events
 March 16 – 29: European Individual Chess Championship in  Batumi
 Winner:  Ivan Šarić
 March 29 – April 2: European Women's Rapid Championship and European Women's Blitz Championship in  Batumi
 Rapid winner:  Elisabeth Pähtz
 Blitz winner:  Anna Muzychuk
 April 7 – 20: European Individual Chess Championship for Women in  Vysoké Tatry
 Winner:  Valentina Gunina
 April 13 – 23: European Senior Team Chess Championship in  Wałbrzych
 50+ winners: 
 65+ winners: 
 June 13 – 21: European Amateur Chess Championship in  Budva
 June 29 – July 8: European School Chess Championship in  Kraków
 July 11 – 19: European Youth Team Championship in  Bad Blankenburg
 July 31 – August 5: European Youth Rapid and Blitz Championships in  Oradea
 August 3 – 13: European Senior Chess Championship in  Drammen
 August 19 – 30: European Youth Chess Championship U8-U18 in  Riga
 October 13 – 21: European Chess Club Cup for Men and Women in  Rhodes
 December 5 – 9: European Rapid & Blitz Chess Championship in  Skopje

American Events
 March 29 – April 3: Carifta Junior Chess Championships 2018 in  Paramaribo
 U8 winners:  Taydan Balliram (m) /  Sylvi Cabral (f)
 U10 winners:  Ky-Mani Wijnhard (m) /  Hannah Wilson (f)
 U12 winners:  Darren Mckennis (m) /  Zara La Fleur (f)
 U14 winners:  Ethan Samuel Croeze (m) /  Vanessa Greenidge (f)
 U16 winners:  Alan-Safar Ramoutar (m) /  Adani Clarke (f)
 U18 winners:  Pierre Chang (m) /  Sheanael Gardner (f)
 U20 winners:  Pierre Chang (m) /  Sheanael Gardner (f)

American Zonals
 March 24 – 30: American Zone 2.3.3 in  San José
 Winners:  Jorge Ernesto Giron (m) /  Thais Castillo Morales (f)

Arab Events
 January 26 – February 2: Arab Individual Championship 2017 (Open & Women) in  Sharjah
 Winners:  Mohamed Haddouche (m) /  Amina Mezioud (f)
 January 26 – February 2: Arab Youth U8-18 Chess Championship 2017 in  Sharjah
 January 26 – February 2: Arab Junior & Girls U20 Chess Championship 2017 in  Sharjah
 Winner:  Ibrahim Sultan
 February 3: Arab Rapid Championship 2017 (Open & Women) in  Sharjah
 Winners:  Mohamed Haddouche (m) /  Ghayda M. Alattar (f)
 February 4: Arab Blitz Championship 2017 (Open & Women) in  Sharjah
 Winners:  Salem Saleh (m) /  Alshaeby Boshra (f)
 February 5 – 12: Arab Chess Club 2017 (Open & Women) in  Sharjah
 Winners:  ASSN

Cricket

Tri-Nation Series
 January 11 – 23: 2017–18 United Arab Emirates Tri-Nation Series in 
 Round robin final ranking: 1. , 2. , 3. 
 January 15 – 27: 2017–18 Bangladesh Tri-Nation Series in 
 In the final,  defeated , 221 (50 overs) – 142 (41.1 overs).
 Sri Lanka won by 79 runs.
 In the final,  defeated , 121/3 (14.4 overs) – 150/9 (20 overs).
 Australia won by 19 runs (D/L method).
 March 6 – 18: 2018 Nidahas Trophy in 
 In the final,  defeated , 168/6 (20 overs) – 166/8 (20 overs).
 India won by 4 wickets.
 March 19 – 31: 2017–18 India women's Tri-Nation Series in 
 In the final,  defeated , 209/4 (20 overs) – 152/9 (20 overs).
 Australia Women won by 57 runs.
 June 12 – 20: 2018 Netherlands Tri-Nation Series in 
 Round robin final ranking: 1. , 2. , 3. 
 June 20 – July 1: 2018 England women's Tri-Nation Series in 
 In the final,  defeated , 141/3 (17.1 overs) – 137/9 (20 overs).
 England Women won by 7 wickets.
 July 1 – 8: 2018 Zimbabwe Tri-Nation Series in 
 In the final,  defeated , 187/4 (19.2 overs) – 183/8 (20 overs).
 Pakistan won by 6 wickets.
 July 29: 2018 MCC Tri-Nation Series in 
Rain affected all three matches. The first two fixtures were both reduced to six overs per side. In the third and final match, only 16.4 overs of play was possible, with the game ending in a no result. Nepal and the Netherlands shared the series.

International Cricket Competitions
 In the final,  India defeated  Pakistan, 309/8 (38.2 overs) – 308/8 (40 overs).
 India won by 2 wickets.
 January 13 – February 3: 2018 Under-19 Cricket World Cup in 
 In the final,  India defeated  Australia, 220/2 (38.5 overs) – 216 (47.2 overs).
 India won by 8 wickets.
 February 8 – 15: 2018 ICC World Cricket League Division Two in 
 In the final,  defeated , 277/4 (50 overs) – 270/8 (50 overs).
 United Arab Emirates won by 7 runs.
 United Arab Emirates and Nepal advanced to the 2018 Cricket World Cup Qualifier.
 Canada and Namibia remained in Division Two.
 Oman and Kenya relegated to Division Three for 2018.
 March 4 – 25: 2018 Cricket World Cup Qualifier in 
 In the final,  defeated , 206/3 (40.4 overs) – 204 (46.5 overs).
 Afghanistan won by 7 wickets.
 Afghanistan and West Indies qualified for the 2019 Cricket World Cup.
 Scotland and United Arab Emirates retained ODI status until 2022.
 Nepal gained ODI status until 2022.
 Papua New Guineea and Hong Kong relegated to Division Two and lost ODI status.
 April 29 – May 6: 2018 ICC World Cricket League Division Four in 
 Round robin final ranking: 1. , 2. , 3. , 4. , 5. , 6. 
 Uganda and Denmark promoted to Division Three for 2018.
 Malaysia and Jersey remain in Division Four.
 Vanuatu and Bermuda relegated to Division Five.
 June 3 – 10: 2018 Women's Twenty20 Asia Cup in 
 In the final,  defeated , 113/7 (20 overs) – 112/9 (20 overs).
 Bangladesh Women won by 3 wickets.
 July 7 – 14: 2018 ICC Women's World Twenty20 Qualifier in 
 In the final,  defeated , 122/9 (20 overs) – 95 (18.4 overs).
 Bangladesh Women won by 25 runs.
 Bangladesh and Ireland qualified for the 2018 ICC Women's World Twenty20.
 August 29 – September 6: 2018 Asia Cup Qualifier in 
 In the final,  defeated , 179/8 (23.3 overs) – 176/9 (24 overs).
 Hong Kong won by 2 wickets (D/L method).
 September 15 – 28: 2018 Asia Cup in 
 In the final,  defeated , 223/7 (50 overs) – 222 (48.3 overs).
 India won by 3 wickets
 November 9 – 21: 2018 ICC World Cricket League Division Three in 
 November 9 – 24: 2018 ICC Women's World Twenty20 in the  West Indies
 In the final,  defeated , 106/2 (15.6 overs) – 105 (19.4 overs).
 Australia won by 8 wickets

Cross-country skiing

Cue sports

Curling

Cycle ball

Cycling – BMX

Cycling – Cyclo-cross

Cycling – Mountain Bike

Cycling – Para-cycling

Cycling – Road

Cycling – Track

Cycling – Trials

Dancesport
Grand Slam
 March 3 & 4: WDSF Grand Slam #1 in  Helsinki
 Adult Standard winners:  Dmitry Zharkov & Olga Kulikova
 Adult Latin winners:  Armen Tsaturyan & Svetlana Gudyno

World Open
 January 13 & 14: WDSF World Open #1 in  Benidorm
 Adult Standard winners:  Evaldas Sodeika & Ieva Žukauskaitė
 Adult Latin winners:  Andrea Silvestri & Martina Varadi
 January 27: WDSF World Open #2 in  Pforzheim
 Adult Latin winners:  Marius-Andrei Balan & Kristina Moshenska
 February 10 & 11: WDSF World Open #3 in  Berchem
 Adult Standard winners:  Evgeny Nikitin & Anastasia Miliutina
 Adult Latin winners:  Andrey Gusev & Vera Bondareva
 February 16 & 17: WDSF World Open #4 in  Copenhagen
 Adult Standard winners:  Alessandro Bosco & Laura Nolan
 Adult Latin winners:  Armen Tsaturyan & Svetlana Gudyno
 February 24: WDSF World Open #5 in  Lisbon
 Adult Latin winners:  Armen Tsaturyan & Svetlana Gudyno
 February 25: WDSF World Open #6 in  Moscow
 Adult Standard winners:  Evgeny Nikitin & Anastasia Miliutina
 February 25: WDSF World Open #7 in  Tokyo
 Adult Standard winners:  Evaldas Sodeika & Ieva Žukauskaitė
 March 10 & 11: WDSF World Open #8 in  Brno
 Adult Standard winners:  Vasily Kirin & Ekaterina Prozorova
 Adult Latin winners:  Edgar Marcos Borjas & Alina Nowak
 March 24 & 25: WDSF World Open #9 in  Pieve di Cento
 Adult Standard winners:  Dmitry Zharkov & Olga Kulikova
 Adult Latin winners:  Armen Tsaturyan & Svetlana Gudyno
 March 25: WDSF PD World Open #10 in  Pieve di Cento
 Adult Standard winners:  Benedetto Ferruggia & Claudia Koehler
 March 30: WDSF World Open #11 in  Berlin
 Adult Standard winners:  Evgeny Moshenin & Dana Spitsyna
 March 31 & April 1: WDSF World Open #12 in  Bucharest
 Adult Standard winners:  Alexey Glukhov & Anastasia Glazunova
 Adult Latin winners:  Marius-Andrei Balan & Khrystyna Moshenska
 March 31 & April 1: WDSF World Open #13 in  Cambrils
 Adult Standard winners:  Anton Skuratov & Alena Uehlin
 Adult Latin winners:  Timur Imametdinov & Nina Bezzubova
 April 7 & 8: World Open #14 in  Moscow
 Adult Standard winners:  Dmitry Zharkov & Olga Kulikova
 Adult Latin winners:  Armen Tsaturyan & Svetlana Gudyno
 April 14 & 15: World Open #15 in  Paphos
 Adult Standard winners:  Daniil Ulanov & Kateryna Isakovych
 Adult Latin winners:  Giacomo Lazzarini & Roberta Benedetti
 April 21 & 22: World Open #16 in  Uzhgorod
 Adult Standard winners:  Dumitru Doga & Sarah Ertmer
 Adult Latin winners:  Marek Bures & Anastasiia Iermolenko
 April 24 & 25: World Open #17 in  San Marino
 Adult Standard winners:  Evgeny Moshenin & Dana Spitsyna
 Adult Latin winners:  Armen Tsaturyan & Svetlana Gudyno
 April 28: World Open #18 in  Chișinău
 Adult Latin winners:  Bogdan Boie & Natalia Luchiv

Grand Prix
 February 25: WDSF PD Super Grand Prix #1 in  Tokyo
 Adult Standard winners:  Benedetto Ferruggia & Claudia Köhler
 March 24: WDSF PD Super Grand Prix #2 in  Pieve di Cento
 Adult Latin winners:  Gabriele Goffredo & Anna Matus

International Competitions
 February 17: WDSF European Championship (Standard) in  Copenhagen
 1st place:  Dmitry Zharkov & Olga Kulikova
 2nd place:  Evaldas Sodeika & Ieva Žukauskaitė
 3rd place:  Francesco Galuppo & Debora Pacini
 February 25: WDSF European Championship (Adult Formation Standard & Youth Latin) in  Sochi
 Youth Latin 1st place:  Egor Kulikov & Maria Goroshko
 Youth Latin 2nd place:  Vladislav Untu & Polina Baryshnikova
 Youth Latin 3rd place:  Danila Mazur & Anastasia Polonskaya
 Adult Formation Standard 1st place:  Vera Tyumen Standard Team
 Adult Formation Standard 2nd place:  1 TC Ludwigsburg
 Adult Formation Standard 3rd place:  Szilver TSE
 March 10: WDSF European Championship (10 Dance) in  Brno
 1st place:  Konstantin Gorodilov & Dominika Bergmannova
 2nd place:  David Odstrčil & Tara Bohak
 3rd place:  Mikhail Koptev & Alexandra Atamantseva
 April 7: WDSF PD World Cup (Adult Standard) in  Chelyabinsk
 1st place:  Donatas Vėželis & Lina Chatkevičiūtė
 2nd place:  Simone Segatori & Annette Sudol
 3rd place:  Bjorn Bitsch & Ashli Williamson
 April 7: WDSF World Championship (Under 21 Ten Dance) in  Moscow
 1st place:  Semen Khrzhanovskiy & Elizaveta Lykhina
 2nd place:  Oleg Chzhen & Alina Ageeva
 3rd place:  Gleb Bannikov & Maria Smirnova
 April 8: WDSF PD World Championship (Adult Show Dance Latin) in  Chelyabinsk
 1st place:  Alexandr Shmonin & Maria Shmonina
 2nd place:  Daniele Sargenti & Uliana Fomenko
 3rd place:  Denis Kikhtenko & Galina Akopian
 April 8: WDSF European Cup (Adult Latin) in  Moscow
 1st place:  Ionuț Alexandru Miculescu & Andra Păcurar
 2nd place:  Vincenzo Mariniello & Sara Casini
 3rd place:  Artem Efanin & Anna Dergunova
 April 28: WDSF World Championship (Junior II Ten Dance) in  Chișinău
 1st place:  Yaroslav Kiselev & Sofia Philipchuk
 2nd place:  Anton Porcesco-Gozun & Paola Popinin
 3rd place:  Răzvan-George Bătrânu & Ana-Maria Dica
 April 29: WDSF European Championship (Youth Ten Dance) in  Chișinău
 1st place:  Vladislav Untu & Polina Baryshnikova
 2nd place:  German Pugachev & Ariadna Tishova
 3rd place:  Gedvinas Meškauskas & Ugnė Bliujūtė

Darts

Professional Darts Corporation

 December 14, 2017 – January 1: 2018 PDC World Darts Championship in  London
  Rob Cross defeated  Phil Taylor, 7–2
 January 26 – 28: 2018 Masters in  Milton Keynes
  Michael van Gerwen defeated  Raymond van Barneveld, 11–9
  Michael van Gerwen defeated  Michael Smith, 11–4
 March 2 – 4: 2018 UK Open in  Minehead
  Gary Anderson defeated  Corey Cadby, 11–7
 May 31 – June 3: 2018 PDC World Cup of Darts in  Frankfurt
  (Michael van Gerwen & Raymond van Barneveld) defeated  (Peter Wright & Gary Anderson), 3–1
 July 21 – 29: 2018 World Matchplay in  Blackpool
  Gary Anderson defeated  Mensur Suljović, 21–19
 September 22 – 23 : 2018 Champions League of Darts in  Brighton
  Gary Anderson defeated  Peter Wright, 11–4
 September 30 – October 6: 2018 World Grand Prix in  Dublin
  Michael van Gerwen defeated  Peter Wright, 5–2
 October 25 – 28: 2018 European Championship in  Dortmund
  James Wade defeated  Simon Whitlock, 11–8
 November 2 – 4: 2018 World Series of Darts Finals in  Vienna
  James Wade defeated  Michael Smith, 11–10
 November 10 – 18: 2018 Grand Slam of Darts in  Wolverhampton
  Gerwyn Price defeated  Gary Anderson, 16–13
 November 23 – 25: 2018 Players Championship Finals in  Minehead
  Daryl Gurney defeated  Michael van Gerwen, 11–9
 November 25: 2018 PDC World Youth Championship Final in  Minehead
  Dimitri Van den Bergh defeated  Martin Schindler, 6–3

World Series of Darts

 May 25: German Darts Masters in  Gelsenkirchen
  Mensur Suljović defeated  Dimitri Van den Bergh, 8–2
 July 5 – 7: US Darts Masters in  Las Vegas
  Gary Anderson defeated  Rob Cross, 8–4
 July 13 – 14: Shanghai Darts Masters in  Shanghai
  Michael Smith defeated  Rob Cross, 8–2
 August 3 – 5: Auckland Darts Masters in  Auckland
  Michael van Gerwen defeated  Raymond van Barneveld, 11–4
 August 10 – 12: Melbourne Darts Masters in  Melbourne
  Peter Wright defeated  Michael Smith, 11–8
 August 17 – 19: Brisbane Darts Masters in  Brisbane
  Rob Cross defeated  Michael van Gerwen, 11–6

British Darts Organisation
 January 6 – 14: 2018 BDO World Darts Championship in  Frimley Green
 Men:  Glen Durrant defeated  Mark McGeeney, 7–6.
 Women:  Lisa Ashton defeated  Anastasia Dobromyslova, 3–1.
 May 30 – June 3: 2018 World Trophy in  Preston
 Men:  Glen Durrant defeated  Michael Unterbuchner, 10–7. 
 Women:  Fallon Sherrock defeated  Lorraine Winstanley, 6–3.
 October 3 – 7: 2018 World Masters in  Bridlington
 Men:  Adam Smith-Neale defeated  Glen Durrant, 6–4.
 Women:  Lisa Ashton defeated  Casey Gallagher, 5–2.

World Darts Federation
 July 6 – 10: WDF Americas Cup in  Claxton Bay
 Men's Singles: 1st.  Robin Albury, 2nd  Anthony Forde, 3rd.  Tom Sawyer, 4th.  Shane Sawyer
 Women's Singles: 1st.  Sandy Hudson, 2nd  Maria Mason, 3rd.  Lisa Ayers, 4th.  Danna Foster
 Team event:  defeated  7–5.
 July 12 – 15: WDF Europe Youth Cup in  Ankara
 Singles:  Jurjen van der Velde (b) /  Beau Greaves (g)
 Pairs:  Heffernan/Barry (b) /  Greaves/Reeves (g)
 Team: 
 September 25 – 29: WDF Europe Cup (National Team) in 
 Singles:  Martin Heneghan (m) /  Fiona Gaylor (f)
 Pairs:  (Scott Mitchell & Daniel Day) (m) /  (Deta Hedman & Maria O'Brien) (f)
 Team:  (m) /  (f)
 October 16 – 19: WDF Asia Pacific Cup in

Disc golf

Major world events
 January 7 – 13: WFDF 2018 World U24 Ultimate Championships in  Perth
Championship
 Men's: 1.  U24, 2.  U24, 3.  U24
 Mixed:  U24, 2.  U24, 3.  U24
 Women's:  U24, 2.  U24, 3.  U24
Spirit
 Men's: 1.  U24, 2.  U24, 3.  U24
 Mixed:  U24, 2.  U24, 3.  U24
 Women's:  U24, 2.  U24, 3.  U24
 July 14 – 21: WFDF 2018 World Ultimate Club Championships in  Cincinnati
 July 29 – August 4: WFDF 2018 World Masters Ultimate Club Championships in  Winnipeg
 Women's: 1. , 2. , 3. 
 Men's: 1. , 2. , 3. 
 Mixed: 1. , 2. , 3. 
 Grand Master Men's: 1. , 2. , 3. 
 August 15 – 19: European Disc Golf Championships in  Sveti Martin na Muri
 Winners:  Simon Lizotte (m) /  Henna Blomroos (f)
 August 18 – 25: WFDF 2018 World Junior Ultimate Championships in  Waterloo

2018 USA National Tour Events
 February 22 – 25: Las Vegas Challenge in  Henderson
 Winners:  Eagle Wynne McMahon (m) /  Paige Pierce (f)
 April 21 – 28: Dynamic Discs Glass Blown Open in  Emporia
 Winners:  Eagle Wynne McMahon (m) /  Paige Pierce (f)
 May 18 – 20: Santa Cruz Masters Cup in  Santa Cruz
 Winners:  Ricky Wysocki (m) /  Paige Pierce (f)
 June 8 – 10: Beaver State Fling in  Estacada
 Winners:  Eagle Wynne McMahon (m) /  Catrina Allen (f)
 September 14 – 16: Delaware Disc Golf Challenge in  Newark
 Winners:  Paul McBeth (m) /  Sarah Hokom (f)
 October 12 – 14: The Ed Headrick Disc Golf Hall of Fame Classic in  Appling
 Winners:  Paul McBeth (m) /  Catrina Allen (f)

2018 Disc Golf Pro Tour
 February 28 – March 3: DGPT #1 – Memorial Championship in  Scottsdale
 Winners:  Simon Lizotte (m) /  Paige Pierce (f)
 March 16 – 18: DGPT #2 – Waco Charity Open in  Waco
 Winners:  Jeremy Koling /  Paige Pierce (f)
 April 6 – 8: DGPT #3 – Jonesboro Open in  Jonesboro
 Winners:  Ricky Wysocki (m) /  Paige Pierce (f)
 May 25 – 27: DGPT #4 – San Francisco Open in  San Francisco
 Winners:  Paul McBeth (m) /  Sarah Hokom (f)
 June 22 – 24: DGPT #5 – Utah Open in  Ogden
 Winners:  Ricky Wysocki (m) /  Catrina Allen (f)
 July 6 – 8: DGPT #6 – Great Lakes Open in  Milford
 Winners:  Paul McBeth (m) /  Sarah Hokom (f)
 July 20 – 22: DGPT #7 – Idlewild Open in  Burlington
 Winners:  Paul McBeth (m) /  Paige Pierce (f)
 August 9 – 12: DGPT #8 – Insurance Open in  Eureka
 Winners:  Nathan Sexton (m) /  Jessica Weese (f)
 August 24 – 26: DGPT #9 – MVP Open in  Leicester
 Winners:  James Conrad (m) /  Sarah Hokom (f)
 October 18 – 21: DGPT #10 – DGPT Tour Championship in  Jacksonville (final)
 Winners:  Chris Dickerson (m) /  Sarah Hokom (f)

European Pro Tour
 April 20 – 22: RE/MAX Open – EPT#1 in  Vierumäki
 Winners:  Mikael Räsänen (m) /  Henna Blomroos (f)
 June 22 – 24: Sula Open 2018 – EPT#2 in  Sula
 Winners:  Gregg Barsby (m) /  Eveliina Salonen (f)
 July 6 – 8: Skellefteå Open – EPT#3 in  Skellefteå
 Winners:  Richard Wysocki (m) /  Eveliina Salonen (f)
 July 20 – 22: The Open – EPT#4 in  Ale (final)
 Winners:  Richard Wysocki (m) /  Kristin Tattar (f)

2018 European Tour
 March 31 & April 1: Dutch Open – ET#1 in  Rijswijk
 Winners:  Dominik Stampfer (m) /  Kaidi Allsalu (f)
 April 14 & 15: Bluebell Woods Open – ET#2 in  Dunbar
 Winners:  Max Regitnig (m) /  Maris Perendi (f)
 May 19 & 20: Kokkedal Open – ET#3 in  Kokkedal & Hillerød
 Winners:  Karl Johan Nybo (m) /  Maris Perendi (f)
 June 9 & 10: Creeksea Classic – ET#4 in  Burnham-on-Crouch
 Winners:  Tony Ferro (m) /  Lauren Kirsch (f)
 June 15 – 17: Alutaguse Open – ET#5 in  Ida-Viru
 Winners:  Paul Ulibarri (m) /  Jenna Suhonen (f)
 August 11 & 12: Sibbe Open – ET#6 in  Sibbe
 Winners:  Olli Pylsy (m) /  Terhi Kytö (f)
 September 7 – 9: Nokia Open in  Nokia (final)
 Winners:  Mikael Räsänen (m) /  Eveliina Salonen (f)

Equestrianism

Fencing

Field hockey

World Cup and Championships
 February 7 – 11: 2018 Men's Indoor Hockey World Cup in  Berlin
  defeated , 3–2 in penalties and after a 3–3 tie in regular play, to win their first Men's Indoor Hockey World Cup title.
  took third place.
 February 7 – 11: 2018 Women's Indoor Hockey World Cup in  Berlin
  took third place.
 June 23 – July 1: 2018 Men's Hockey Champions Trophy in  Amsterdam
  defeated , 3–1 in penalties and after a 1–1 score in regular play, to win their 15th Men's Hockey Champions Trophy title.
  took third place.
 July 21 – August 5: 2018 Women's Hockey World Cup in  London
  defeated , 6–0, to win their second consecutive and eighth overall Women's Hockey World Cup title.
  took third place.
 November 28 – December 16: 2018 Men's Hockey World Cup in  Bhubaneswar
  defeated , 3–2 in penalties and after a 0–0 score in regular play, to win their first Men's Hockey World Cup title.
  took third place.

Other international and continental competitions
 March 3 – 10: 2018 Sultan Azlan Shah Cup in  Ipoh
  defeated , 2–1, to win their tenth Sultan Azlan Shah Cup title.
  took third place.
 June 5 – September 23: 2018–19 Men's Hockey Series Open
 Salamanca final ranking: 1. , 2. , 3. , 4. , 5. 
 Singapore final ranking: 1. , 2. , 3. , 4. , 5. , 6. 
 Zagreb final ranking: 1. , 2. , 3. , 4. , 5. 
 Port Vila final Ranking: 1. . 2. , 3. , 4. 
 Gniezno final Ranking: 1. , 2. , 3. , 4. , 5. , 6. 
 Lousada final Ranking: 1. , 2. , 3. , 4. , 5. , 6. 
 Santiago final Ranking: 1. , 2. , 3. , 4. , 5. , 6. 
 Bulawayo final Ranking: 1. , 2. , 3. , 4. 
 June 5 – September 23: 2018–19 Women's Hockey Series Open
 Salamanca final ranking: 1. , 2. , 3. , 4. , 5. 
 Singapore final ranking: 1. , 2. , 3. , 4. , 5. , 6. 
 Wattignies final ranking: 1. , 2. , 3. , 4. 
 Port Vila final ranking: 1. , 2. , 3. , 4. 
 Vilnius final ranking: , 2. , 3. , 4. , 5. 
 Santiago final ranking: 1. , 2. , 3. , 4. , 5. , 6. 
 Bulawayo final Ranking: 1. , 2. , 3.

EHF
Club teams
 October 6, 2017 – May 27: 2017–18 Euro Hockey League
  HC Bloemendaal defeated fellow Dutch team, SV Kampong, 8–2, to win their third Euro Hockey League title.
  HC Rotterdam took third place.
 February 16 – 18: 2018 Men's EuroHockey Indoor Club Challenge II in  Tbilisi
 Final Standings: 1st:  Three Rock Rovers HC, 2nd:  Kringsjå Sportsklubb, 3rd:  Hrazdan Hockey Club
 February 16 – 18: 2018 Men's EuroHockey Indoor Club Trophy in  Minsk
 Final Standings: 1st:  HC Minsk, 2nd:  Partille Sport Club, 3rd:  KS Pomorzanin Toruń, 4th:  Slagelse HC
 February 16 – 18: 2018 Men's EuroHockey Indoor Club Challenge I in  Prague
 Final Standings: 1st:  SK Slavia Prague, 2nd:  Gaziantep Polis Gücü SK, 3rd:  HC OKS-SHVSM Vinnitsa, 4th:  A.D. Lousada
 February 16 – 18: 2018 Men's EuroHockey Indoor Club Cup in  Wettingen
 In the final,  Rot-Weiss Köln defeated  R. Racing Club Bruxelles, 5–2. 
  Dinamo Elektrostal took third place.
 February 23 – 25: 2018 Women's EuroHockey Indoor Club Challenge I in  Murska Sobota
 Final Standings: 1st:  Bolu Belediyesi SK, 2nd:  CUS Pisa, 3rd:  Partille Sport Club, 4th:  FHC Akademik Plus
 February 23 – 25: 2018 Women's EuroHockey Indoor Club Trophy in  Prague
 Final Standings: 1st:  Royal White Star HC, 2nd:  Dinamo Elektrostal, 3rd:  SK Slavia Prague, 4th:  Gintra Strekte Uni HC
 February 23 – 25: 2018 Women's EuroHockey Indoor Club Cup in  Dundee
 In the final,  Uhlenhorster HC defeated  Club de Campo Villa de Madrid, 6–2. 
  Amsterdamsche Hockey & Bandy Club took third place.
 May 17 – 20: 2018 Men's EuroHockey Club Challenge IV in  Helsinki
 In the final,  HK Moravske Toplice defeated  ABC-Team, 2–1. 
  Soroksári – Olcote HC took third place.
 May 17 – 20: 2018 Men's EuroHockey Club Challenge II in  Lipovci
 In the 1st promotion playoff  Whitchurch HC defeated  Grammarians HC, 3–1 in a shoot-out after the match ended in a 4–4 draw.
 In the 2nd promotion playoff  Hokejski Klub Zelina defeated  HK Lipovci, 8–4.
 Hokejski Klub Zelina and Whitchurch HC were joint winners whilst Grammarians HC and HK Lipovci were joint 3rd.
 May 17 – 20: 2018 EuroHockey Club Champions Cup in  London
  HC 's-Hertogenbosch defeated  Hamburg, 2–1, to win their third consecutive and 16th overall EuroHockey Club Champions Cup title.
  Club de Campo took third place.
 May 18 – 21: 2018 Men's EuroHockey Club Challenge I in  Geneva
 In the final,  HC Slavia Praha defeated  HAHK Mladost, 3–0. 
  C.F. União de Lamas took third place.
 May 18 – 21: 2018 Women's EuroHockey Club Challenge II in  Ghent
 In the final,  Gantoise HC defeated  Žuvėdra-Tauras, 16–0. 
  Black Boys HC Geneve took third place.
 May 18 – 21: 2018 Women's EuroHockey Club Challenge III in  Vienna
 In the final,  Gaziantep Polis Gücü SK defeated  Hockey Klub Zelina, 19–0. 
  Navax AHTC Wien took third place.
 May 18 – 21: 2018 Men's EuroHockey Club Challenge III in  Copenhagen
 In the final,  Gaziantep Polis Gücü SK defeated  Nacka LHK, 5–1. 
  Žuvėdra-Tauras took third place.
 May 18 – 21: 2018 Men's EuroHockey Club Trophy in  Vienna
  Grange HC defeated  HC OKS-SHVSM Vinnitsa, 5–2, in the final.
  HC Minsk took third place.
 May 18 – 21: 2018 Women's EuroHockey Club Challenge I in  Edinburgh
 In the final,  Edinburgh University HC defeated  Milne Craig Clydesdale Western, 1–0. 
  Braxgata HC took third place.
 May 18 – 21: 2018 Women's EuroHockey Club Trophy in  Dublin
  Holcombe HC defeated  Junior FC, 4–2 in a shootout and after a 1–1 score, in the final.
  GHC Ritm Grodno took third place.

National teams
 January 12 – 14: 2018 Men's EuroHockey Indoor Nations Championship in  Antwerp
 In the final,  defeated , after penalties, 2–1. Regular match was 4–4. 
  took third place.
 January 12 – 14: 2018 Men's EuroHockey Indoor Nations Championship II in  Alanya
 Final Standings: 1st: , 2nd: , 3rd: , 4th: 
 January 12 – 14: 2018 Men's EuroHockey Indoor Nations Championship III in  Nicosia
 Final Standings: 1st: , 2nd: , 3rd: , 4th: , 5th: , 6th: , 7th: 
 January 19 – 21: 2018 Women's EuroHockey Indoor Nations Championship in  Prague
  took third place.
 January 19 – 21: 2018 Women's EuroHockey Indoor Nations Championship II in  Brussels
 Final Standings: 1st: , 2nd: , 3rd: , 4th: 
 January 20 & 21: 2018 Women's EuroHockey Indoor Nations Championship III in  Apače
 Final Standings: 1st: , 2nd: , 3rd: 
 June 21 – 24: EuroHockey South East Europe Championships Hockey5s U15 Boys & Girls in  Albena
 Boys final ranking: 1st: , 2nd: , 3rd: 
 Girls final ranking: 1st: , 2nd: , 3rd: 
 July 15 – 21: 2018 EuroHockey Youth U18 Championships III for boy's and girl's in  Konya
 Boys final ranking: 1st: , 2nd: , 3rd: 
 Girls final ranking: 1st: , 2nd: , 3rd: 
 July 15 – 21: 2018 EuroHockey Youth U18 Championship II Girls in  Rakovník
 Girls final ranking: 1st: , 2nd: , 3rd: 
 July 15 – 21: 2018 EuroHockey Youth U18 Championships for boy's and girl's in  Santander
 Boys final ranking: 1st: , 2nd: , 3rd: 
 Girls final ranking: 1st: , 2nd: , 3rd: 
 July 22 – 28: 2018 EuroHockey Youth U18 Championships II in  Cardiff
 Boys final ranking: 1st: , 2nd: , 3rd:

PAHF
 March 12 – 17: 2018 Youth Pan American Championships (Men) in  Guadalajara
 In the final,  defeated , 3–2.  took third place and  took fourth place.
 March 12 – 17: 2018 Youth Pan American Championships (Women) in  Guadalajara
 In the final,  defeated , 4–0.  took third place and  took fourth place.

AHF
 May 13 – 20: 2018 Asian Women's Hockey Champions Trophy in  Donghae City
  defeated , 1–0, to win their third Asian Women's Hockey Champions Trophy title.
  took third place.
 October 18 – 28: 2018 Asian Men's Hockey Champions Trophy in  Muscat
 Note: Due to heavy rain, both  and  took first place here.
  took third place.

Figure skating

Fistball

IFA
 July 11 – 15: IFA 2018 Fistball U18 World Championships in  Roxbury Township
 July 24 – 28: IFA 2018 Fistball Women's World Championship in  Linz

EFA
 January 6 & 7: EFA 2018 Fistball Women's Champions Cup in  Jona
 In the final,  TSV Dennach defeated  Titel gg. Union Nussbach, 4–2 (11–7, 6–11, 8–11, 13–11, 11–8, 11–6).
  TSV Jona took third place.
 January 12 & 13: EFA 2018 Fistball Men's Champions Cup Indoor in  Dötlingen
 In the final,  TSV Pfungstadt defeated  TV Brettorf, 4–2 (11:9, 6:11, 5:11, 11:5, 11:5, 11:8).
  SVD Diepoldsau-Schmitter took third place.
 July 6 – 8: EFA 2018 Men's European Cup in 
 July 7 & 8: EFA 2018 Fistball Women's Champions Cup in  Schneverdingen
 July 6 – 8: EFA 2018 Men's Champions Cup in

Floorball

Europe
 August 22 – 26: EuroFloorball Challenge
 October 10 – 14: EuroFloorball Cup

Asia & Oceania
 June 18 – 23: AOFC Cup 2018 in

World and Continental
 May 2 – 6: 2018 Women's U19 World Floorball Championships in  St.Gallen & Herisau
 In final,  defeated , 7–2, to win their 5th Under-19 World Floorball Championships.  took third place and  fourth place.
 June 26 – 30: 8th World University Floorball Championship in  Łódź
 December 1 – 9: 2018 Men's World Floorball Championships in  Prague
 In final,  defeated , 6–3, to win their 4th Men's World Floorball Championship.  took third place and  fourth place.

Freestyle skiing

Futsal

Golf

2018 Men's major golf championships
 April 5 – 8: 2018 Masters Tournament in  Augusta
 Winner:  Patrick Reed (first major title & 6th PGA Tour win)
 June 14 – 17: 2018 U.S. Open in  Southampton
 Winner:  Brooks Koepka (second major title, 2nd U.S. Open title, & 3rd PGA Tour win)
 July 19 – 22: 2018 Open Championship in  Carnoustie
 Winner:  Francesco Molinari (first major title & 2nd PGA Tour win)
 August 9 – 12: 2018 PGA Championship in  St. Louis
 Winner:  Brooks Koepka (third major title, 1st PGA Championship title, & 4th PGA Tour win)

2018 World Golf Championships (WGC)
 March 1 – 4: 2018 WGC-Mexico Championship in  Naucalpan at the Club de Golf Chapultepec
 Winner:  Phil Mickelson (third WGC-Mexico Championship title & 43rd PGA Tour win)
 March 21 – 25: 2018 WGC-Dell Technologies Match Play in  Austin
 Winner:  Bubba Watson (first WGC-Dell Technologies Match Play title & 13th PGA Tour win)
 August 2 – 5: 2018 WGC-Bridgestone Invitational in  Akron
 Winner:  Justin Thomas (first WGC-Bridgestone Invitational title & 9th PGA Tour win)
 October 25 – 28: 2018 WGC-HSBC Champions in  Shanghai
 Winner:  Xander Schauffele (first WGC-HSBC Champions title & 3rd PGA Tour win)

2018 Women's major golf championships
 March 29 – April 1: 2018 ANA Inspiration in Rancho Mirage, California
 Winner:  Pernilla Lindberg (first major title and first LPGA Tour win)
 May 31 – June 3: 2018 U.S. Women's Open in Shoal Creek, Alabama
 Winner:  Ariya Jutanugarn (second major title, first U.S. Women's Open title, and ninth LPGA Tour win)
 June 28 – July 1: 2018 KPMG Women's PGA Championship in Kildeer, Illinois
 Winner:  Park Sung-hyun (second major title, first KPMG Women's PGA Championship title, and fourth LGPA Tour win)
 August 2 – 5: 2018 Women's British Open in Lancashire, England
 Winner:  Georgia Hall (first major title and first LPGA Tour win)
 September 13 – 16: 2018 Evian Championship in Évian-les-Bains, France
 Winner:  Angela Stanford (first major title and sixth LPGA Tour win)

2018 Senior major golf championships
 May 17 – 20: Regions Tradition in  Birmingham
 Winner:  Miguel Ángel Jiménez (first senior major title & 5th PGA Tour Champions win)
 May 24 – 27: Senior PGA Championship in  Benton Harbor
 Winner:  Paul Broadhurst (first Senior PGA Championship & 4th PGA Tour Champions win)
 June 28 – July 1: U.S. Senior Open in  Colorado Springs
 Winner:  David Toms (first U.S. Senior Open & first PGA Tour Champions win)
 July 12 – 15: Senior Players Championship in  Highland Park at the Exmoor Country Club
 Winner:  Vijay Singh (first Senior Players Championship & 3rd PGA Tour Champions win)
 July 26 – 29: Senior Open Championship in  Fife
 Winner:  Miguel Ángel Jiménez (second senior major title & 6th PGA Tour Champions win)

2018 women's senior events
 July 12 – 15: 2018 U.S. Senior Women's Open in  Wheaton, Illinois
 Winner:  Laura Davies (inaugural U.S. Senior Women's Open & second Legends Tour win)
 October 14 – 17: 2018 Senior LPGA Championship in  French Lick & West Baden Springs, Indiana
 Winner:  Laura Davies (first Senior LPGA Championship win.)

Other golf events
 January 12 – 14: 2018 EurAsia Cup in  Shah Alam
  Team Europe defeated Team Asia, 14–10, to win their second consecutive EurAsia Cup title.
 May 10 – 13: 2018 Players Championship
 Winner:  Webb Simpson (first Players Championship title; fifth PGA Tour victory)
 May 16 – 19: 2018 World University Golf Championship in  Lubao, Pampanga
 Individual winners:  Daiki Imano (m) /  MA Da-som (f)
 Team winners:  (Daiki Imano, Yuto Katsuragawa, & Taisei Shimizu) (m) /  (KANG Min-ji, MA Da-som, & SON Yeon-jung) (f)
 September 28 – 30: 2018 Ryder Cup at the Albatros Course of Le Golf National in  Saint-Quentin-en-Yvelines
  Team Europe defeated  Team USA, 17½–10½, to win their 12th Ryder Cup title.
 October 4 – 7: 2018 International Crown at Jack Nicklaus Golf Club Korea in  Incheon
 Winners:  (Park Sung-hyun, Ryu So-yeon, In-Kyung Kim, & Chun In-gee) (first International Crown win)

Gymnastics

Handball

World handball championships
 July 1 – 14: 2018 Women's Junior World Handball Championship in  Debrecen
  defeated , 28–22, to win their first Women's Junior World Handball Championship title.
  took third place.
 July 24 – 29: 2018 Beach Handball World Championships for Men and Women in  Kazan
 Men:  defeated , 2 out of 3 matches played, to win their fifth Men's Beach Handball World Championships title.
  took third place.
 Women:  defeated , 2–1 in matches played, to win their first Women's Beach Handball World Championships title.
  took third place.
 July 30 – August 5: 2018 World University Handball Championship in  Rijeka
 Men:  defeated , 36–31, in the final.  took third place.
 Women:  defeated , 27–19, in the final.  took third place.
 August 7 – 19: 2018 Women's Youth World Handball Championship in  Kielce
  defeated , 29–27, to win their second consecutive and third overall Women's Youth World Handball Championship title.
  took third place.

EHF
National teams
 January 12 – 28: 2018 European Men's Handball Championship in 
  defeated , 29–23, to win their 1st European Men's Handball Championship.  took third place.
 Note: Both Spain & France have qualified to compete at the 2019 World Men's Handball Championship. ( &  co-hosting the event.)
 August 9 – 19: 2018 European Men's U-18 Handball Championship in  Varaždin & Koprivnica
  defeated , 32–27, to win their second European Men's U-18 Handball Championship title.
  took third place.

Clubs
 August 30, 2017 – March 17: 2017–18 SEHA League
 April 13 & 15: 2017–18 SEHA League Final Four in  Skopje
  RK Vardar defeated  PPD Zagreb, 26–24, to win their second consecutive and fourth overall SEHA League title.
  Celje Pivovarna Laško took third place.
 September 2, 2017 – May 20: 2017–18 EHF Cup
  Füchse Berlin defeated  Saint-Raphaël, 28–25, to win their second EHF Cup title.
  SC Magdeburg took third place.
 September 2, 2017 – May 27: 2017–18 EHF Champions League
  Montpellier defeated fellow French team, HBC Nantes, 32–26, to win their second EHF Champions League title.
  Paris Saint-Germain took third place.
 September 8, 2017 – May 11: 2017–18 Women's EHF Cup
  SCM Craiova defeated  Vipers Kristiansand, 52–51 on aggregate, to win their first Women's EHF Cup title.
 September 9, 2017 – May 13: 2017–18 Women's EHF Champions League
  Győri ETO defeated  HC Vardar, 27–26 in overtime, to win their second consecutive and fourth overall Women's EHF Champions League title.
  CSM București took third place.
 October 7, 2017 – May 20: 2017–18 EHF Challenge Cup
  AHC Potaissa Turda defeated  A.E.K. Athens, 59–49 on aggregate in a 2-legged matches, to win their first EHF Challenge Cup title.
 October 14, 2017 – May 13: 2017–18 Women's EHF Challenge Cup
  MKS Lublin defeated  Rocasa Gran Canaria, 49–45 on aggregate in a 2-legged matches, to win their first Women's EHF Challenge Cup title.

AHF
National teams
 January 18 – 28: 2018 Asian Men's Handball Championship in  Suwon
 In the final,  defeated , 33–31, to win their 3rd Asian Men's Handball Championship.  took third place.
 February 15 – 21: 2018 West Asian Women's Handball Championship in  Amman
 Winners: 1st place: , 2nd place: , 3rd place: 
 July 16 – 26: 2018 Asian Men's Junior Handball Championship in  Salalah
  defeated , 27–25 in extra time, to win their third Asian Men's Junior Handball Championship title.
  took third place.
 Note: All teams mentioned above have qualified to compete at the 2019 Men's Junior World Handball Championship.
 September 16 – 26: 2018 Asian Men's Youth Handball Championship in  Amman
  defeated , 34–31, to win their second consecutive Asian Men's Youth Handball Championship title.
  took third place.
 Note: All teams mentioned here have qualified to compete at the 2019 Men's Youth World Handball Championship.
 November 30 – December 9: 2018 Asian Women's Handball Championship in  Kumamoto
  defeated , 30–25, to win their 14th Asian Women's Handball Championship title.
  took third place.

Clubs
 October 3 – 9: 2018 Asian Women's Club League Handball Championship in  Astana
 Champions:  Almaty Club; Second:  Kaysar Club; Third:  Astana Club
 November 10 – 23: 2018 Asian Men's Club League Handball Championship in  Amman

CAHB
National teams
 January 17 – 28: 2018 African Men's Handball Championship in  Libreville
  defeated , 26–24, to win their 10th African Men's Handball Championship.  took third place.
 Note: All teams mentioned here have qualified to compete at the 2019 World Men's Handball Championship.

Clubs
 April 12 – 22: 2018 African Men's and Women's Club Handball Championship in

PATHF
National teams
 March 21 – 25: 2018 Pan American Women's Junior Handball Championship in  Goiânia
 Note: All teams mentioned above have qualified to compete at the 2018 Women's Junior World Handball Championship.
 April 10 – 14: 2018 Pan American Women's Youth Handball Championship in  Buenos Aires
 Note: All teams mentioned above have qualified to compete at the 2018 Women's Youth World Handball Championship.
 June 16 – 24: 2018 Pan American Men's Handball Championship in  Nuuk
  defeated , 29–24, to win their seventh Pan American Men's Handball Championship title.
  took third place.
 Note: All three teams mentioned above have qualified to compete at the 2019 World Men's Handball Championship.
 November 29 – December 4: 2018 South and Central American Women's Handball Championship in  Maceió
 Note: Brazil and Argentina have qualified to compete at the 2019 World Women's Handball Championship.

Clubs
 May 23 – 27: 2018 Pan American Men's Club Handball Championship in  Taubaté
  Handebol Taubaté defeated  SAG Villa Ballester, 26–18, to win their fifth Pan American Men's Club Handball Championship title.
  EC Pinheiros took third place.
 Note: Handebol Taubaté has qualified to compete at the 2018 IHF Super Globe.

Horse racing

Ice climbing

Ice hockey

Judo

Karate

Kickboxing

Korfball

Europe
 January 11 – 13: IKF Europa Cup 2018 in  Castell-Platja d'Aro
 In the final,  KV TOP/SolarCompleet defeated  AKC/Luma Korfbalclub, 28–21. 
  SG Pegasus took third place and  Núcleo Corfebol Benfica took fourth place.
 January 26 – 28: IKF Europa Shield 2018 in  Odivelas
 In the final,  KV Adler Rauxel defeated  Bec Korfball Club, 16–13.
  Brno KK took third place and  Norwich Knights KC took fourth place.
 March 30 – April 1: IKF U19 Open European Korfball Championship in  Leeuwarden
 In the final,  defeated , 25–18. 
  took third place and  took fourth place.
 June 28 – July 1: U15 European Korfball Championship in  Drachten

Americas
 March 2 – 4: IKF 2018 Pan-American Korfball Championship in  Cali
 Winners: , 2nd place: , 3rd place: , 4th place: , 5th place: , 6th place:

Africa
 April 27 – 29: IKF 2018 All-Africa Korfball Championship in  Chitungwiza
 Winners: , 2nd place: , 3rd place:

Asia
 April 10 – 15: 3rd IKF Asia U19 & U16 Korfball4 Championships in  Taoyuan
 U16 final ranking: 1. , 2. , 3. , 4. , 5. , 6. 
 U19 final ranking: 1. , 2. , 3. , 4. , 5. , 6.

World
 June 23 & 24: U17 Korfball World Cup in  Eindhoven
 In the final,  defeated , 22–17. 
  took third place and  took fourth place.
 July 7 – 14: IKF U21 World Korfball Championship im  Budapest
 August 8 – 12: 1st University World Korfball Championship in  Vila Real
 August 11 & 12: IKF Beach Korfball World Cup in  Blankenberge
 In the final,  defeated , 8–4.
  took third place and  took fourth place.

Lacrosse

 July 12 – 21: 2018 World Lacrosse Championship in  Netanya
  defeated , 9–8, to win their tenth World Lacrosse Championship title.
  took third place.
 August 4 – 11: 2018 European Women's Under 20s Lacrosse Championship in  Katowice
  defeated , 12–3, in the final.  took third place.

Luge

Minifootball

WMF
 October 4 – 7: U21 WMF World Cup in  Prague
 In the final,  defeated , 2–1.
  took third place and  took fourth place.
 October 13 – 20: WMF Arena Soccer World Championship 2018 in  Hermosillo
 TBD for December: WMF Continental Cup in

EMF
 August 12 – 18: 2018 EMF EURO in  Kyiv
 In the final,  defeated , 4–1, to win the 1st title.
  took third place and  took fourth place.
 September 5 – 9: EMF Champions League 2018 in  Čatež ob Savi
 In the final,  MAV Sports Timișoara defeated  AS Coriolan Bacău, 2–1, after penalties, (initial match ended 0–0) to win the 1st title.
  Juventus Sibiu took third place and  Tanzmannschaft București took fourth place.

CPM
 June 7 – 12: 2018 Pan-American Cup in 
 In the final,  defeated , 9–2, to win the title.
  took third place and  took fourth place.

AMF
 May 5 – 12: 2018 African Minifootball Cup in 
 In the final  defeated , 3–1, after penalties, (initial match ended 3–3) to win the 1st edition.
  took third place and  took fourth place.

Mixed martial arts

Modern pentathlon

Motorsport

2018 Formula One World Championship

 March 25:  2018 Australian Grand Prix Winner:  Sebastian Vettel ( Ferrari)
 April 8:  2018 Bahrain Grand Prix Winner:  Sebastian Vettel ( Ferrari)
 April 15:  2018 Chinese Grand Prix Winner:  Daniel Ricciardo ( Red Bull Racing-TAG Heuer)
 April 29:  2018 Azerbaijan Grand Prix Winner:  Lewis Hamilton ( Mercedes)
 May 13:  2018 Spanish Grand Prix Winner:   Lewis Hamilton ( Mercedes)
 May 27:  2018 Monaco Grand Prix Winner:  Daniel Ricciardo ( Red Bull Racing-TAG Heuer)
 June 10:  2018 Canadian Grand Prix Winner:  Sebastian Vettel ( Ferrari)
 June 24:  2018 French Grand Prix Winner:  Lewis Hamilton ( Mercedes)
 July 1:  2018 Austrian Grand Prix Winner:  Max Verstappen ( Red Bull Racing-TAG Heuer)
 July 8:  2018 British Grand Prix Winner:  Sebastian Vettel ( Ferrari)
 July 22:  2018 German Grand Prix Winner:  Lewis Hamilton ( Mercedes)
 July 29:  2018 Hungarian Grand Prix Winner:  Lewis Hamilton ( Mercedes)
 August 26:  2018 Belgian Grand Prix Winner:  Sebastian Vettel ( Ferrari)
 September 2:  2018 Italian Grand Prix Winner:  Lewis Hamilton ( Mercedes)
 September 16:  2018 Singapore Grand Prix Winner:  Lewis Hamilton ( Mercedes)
 September 30:  2018 Russian Grand Prix Winner:  Lewis Hamilton ( Mercedes)
 October 7:  2018 Japanese Grand Prix Winner:  Lewis Hamilton ( Mercedes)
 October 21:  2018 United States Grand Prix Winner:  Kimi Räikkönen ( Ferrari)
 October 28:  2018 Mexican Grand Prix Winner:  Max Verstappen ( Red Bull Racing-TAG Heuer)
 November 11:  2018 Brazilian Grand Prix Winner:  Lewis Hamilton ( Mercedes)
 November 25:  2018 Abu Dhabi Grand Prix (final):  Lewis Hamilton ( Mercedes)

2017–18 Formula E season
 December 2 & 3, 2017:  2017 Hong Kong ePrix
 Winners: Race #1:  Sam Bird ( DS Virgin Racing) / Race #2:  Felix Rosenqvist ( Mahindra Racing)
 January 13:  2018 Marrakesh ePrix Winner:  Felix Rosenqvist ( Mahindra Racing)
 February 3:  2018 Santiago ePrix Winner:  Jean-Éric Vergne ( Techeetah)
 March 3:  2018 Mexico City ePrix Winner:  Daniel Abt ( Audi Sport Abt Schaeffler)
 March 17:  2018 Punta del Este ePrix Winner:  Jean-Éric Vergne ( Techeetah)
 14 April 2018:  2018 Rome ePrix Winner:  Sam Bird ( DS Virgin Racing)
 28 April 2018:  2018 Paris ePrix Winner:  Jean-Éric Vergne ( Techeetah)
 19 May 2018:  2018 Berlin ePrix Winner:  Daniel Abt ( Audi Sport Abt Schaeffler)
 10 June 2018:  2018 Zürich ePrix Winner:  Lucas Di Grassi ( Audi Sport Abt Schaeffler)
 July 14 & 15 2018:  2018 New York City ePrix (final)
 Winners: Race #1:  Lucas Di Grassi ( Audi Sport Abt Schaeffler) / Race #2:  Jean-Éric Vergne ( Techeetah)

2018 MotoGP season
 March 18:  2018 Qatar motorcycle Grand Prix
 MotoGP winner:  Andrea Dovizioso ( Ducati)
 Moto2 winner:  Francesco Bagnaia ( Kalex)
 Moto3 winner:  Jorge Martín ( Honda)
 April 8:  2018 Argentine motorcycle Grand Prix
 MotoGP winner:  Cal Crutchlow ( Honda)
 Moto2 winner:  Mattia Pasini ( Kalex)
 Moto3 winner:  Marco Bezzecchi ( KTM)
 April 22:  2018 Motorcycle Grand Prix of the Americas
 MotoGP winner:  Marc Márquez ( Honda)
 Moto2 winner:  Francesco Bagnaia ( Kalex)
 Moto3 winner:  Jorge Martín ( Honda)
 May 6:  2018 Spanish motorcycle Grand Prix
 MotoGP winner:  Marc Márquez ( Honda)
 Moto2 winner:  Lorenzo Baldassarri ( Kalex)
 Moto3 winner:  Philipp Öttl ( KTM)
 May 20:  2018 French motorcycle Grand Prix
 MotoGP winner:  Marc Márquez ( Honda)
 Moto2 winner:  Francesco Bagnaia ( Kalex)
 Moto3 winner:  Albert Arenas ( KTM)
 June 3:  2018 Italian motorcycle Grand Prix
 MotoGP winner:  Jorge Lorenzo ( Ducati)
 Moto2 winner:  Miguel Oliveira ( KTM)
 Moto3 winner:  Jorge Martín ( Honda)
 June 17:  2018 Catalan motorcycle Grand Prix
 MotoGP winner:  Jorge Lorenzo ( Ducati)
 Moto2 winner:  Fabio Quartararo ( Speed Up)
 Moto3 winner:  Enea Bastianini ( Honda)
 July 1:  2018 Dutch TT
 MotoGP winner:  Marc Márquez ( Honda)
 Moto2 winner:  Francesco Bagnaia ( Kalex)
 Moto3 winner:  Jorge Martín ( Honda)
 July 15:  2018 German motorcycle Grand Prix
 MotoGP winner:  Marc Márquez ( Honda)
 Moto2 winner:  Brad Binder ( KTM)
 Moto3 winner:  Jorge Martín ( Honda)
 August 5:  2018 Czech Republic motorcycle Grand Prix
 MotoGP winner:  Andrea Dovizioso ( Ducati)
 Moto2 winner:  Miguel Oliveira ( KTM)
 Moto3 winner:  Fabio Di Giannantonio ( Honda)
 August 12:  2018 Austrian motorcycle Grand Prix
 MotoGP winner:  Jorge Lorenzo ( Ducati)
 Moto2 winner:  Francesco Bagnaia ( Kalex)
 Moto3 winner:  Marco Bezzecchi ( KTM)
 August 26:  2018 British motorcycle Grand Prix
 Event cancelled, due to unsafe track conditions.
 September 9:  2018 San Marino and Rimini's Coast motorcycle Grand Prix
 MotoGP winner:  Andrea Dovizioso ( Ducati)
 Moto2 winner:  Francesco Bagnaia ( Kalex)
 Moto3 winner:  Lorenzo Dalla Porta ( Honda)
 September 23:  2018 Aragon motorcycle Grand Prix
 MotoGP winner:  Marc Márquez ( Honda)
 Moto2 winner:  Brad Binder ( KTM)
 Moto3 winner:  Jorge Martín ( Honda)
 October 7:  2018 Thailand motorcycle Grand Prix
 MotoGP winner:  Marc Márquez ( Honda)
 Moto2 winner:  Francesco Bagnaia ( Kalex)
 Moto3 winner:  Fabio Di Giannantonio ( Honda)
 October 21:  2018 Japanese motorcycle Grand Prix
 MotoGP winner:  Marc Márquez ( Honda)
 Moto2 winner:  Francesco Bagnaia ( Kalex)
 Moto3 winner:  Marco Bezzecchi ( KTM)
 October 28:  2018 Australian motorcycle Grand Prix
 MotoGP winner:  Maverick Viñales ( Yamaha)
 Moto2 winner:  Brad Binder ( KTM)
 Moto3 winner:  Albert Arenas ( KTM)
 November 4:  2018 Malaysian motorcycle Grand Prix
 MotoGP winner:  Marc Márquez ( Honda)
 Moto2 winner:  Luca Marini ( Kalex)
 Moto3 winner:  Jorge Martín ( Honda)
 November 18:  2018 Valencian Community motorcycle Grand Prix (final)
 MotoGP winner:  Andrea Dovizioso ( Ducati)
 Moto2 winner:  Miguel Oliveira ( KTM)
 Moto3 winner:  Can Öncü ( KTM)

2018 Deutsche Tourenwagen Masters

Endurance

2018–19 FIA World Endurance Championship
 5 May 2018:  2018 6 Hours of Spa-Francorchamps Winners:
   LMP1:  #8 Toyota Gazoo Racing
  LMP2:  #38 Jackie Chan DC Racing
  GTE Pro:  #66 Ford Chip Ganassi Team UK
  GTE Am:  #98 Aston Martin Racing
 16–17 June 2018:  2018 24 Hours of Le Mans
   LMP1:  #8 Toyota Gazoo Racing
  LMP2:  #36 Signatech Alpine Matmut
  GTE Pro:  #92 Porsche GT Team
  GTE Am:  #77 Dempsey-Proton Racing
 19 August 2018:  2018 6 Hours of Silverstone
   LMP1:  #3 Rebellion Racing
  LMP2:  #38 Jackie Chan DC Racing
  GTE Pro:  #51 AF Corse
  GTE Am:  #77 Dempsey-Proton Racing
 14 October 2018:  2018 6 Hours of Fuji
   LMP1:  #7 Toyota Gazoo Racing
  LMP2:  #37 Jackie Chan DC Racing
  GTE Pro:  #92 Porsche GT Team
  GTE Am:  #56 Team Project 1
 18 November 2018:  2018 6 Hours of Shanghai
   LMP1:  #7 Toyota Gazoo Racing
  LMP2:  #38 Jackie Chan DC Racing
  GTE Pro:  #95 Aston Martin Racing
  GTE Am:  #77 Dempsey-Proton Racing
 15 March 2019:  2019 1000 Miles of Sebring
   LMP1:  #8 Toyota Gazoo Racing
  LMP2:  #37 Jackie Chan DC Racing
  GTE Pro:  #91 Porsche GT Team
  GTE Am:  #77 Dempsey-Proton Racing
 4 May 2019:  2019 6 Hours of Spa-Francorchamps
   LMP1:  #8 Toyota Gazoo Racing
  LMP2:  #31 DragonSpeed
  GTE Pro:  #97 Aston Martin Racing
  GTE Am: 
 15–16 June 2019:  2019 24 Hours of Le Mans (final)
   LMP1:  #8 Toyota Gazoo Racing
  LMP2:  #36 Signatech Alpine Matmut
  GTE Pro:  #51 AF Corse
  GTE Am:  #56 Team Project 1

2017-18 FIM Endurance World Championship
 16–17 September 2017:  2018 Bol d'Or Winners:  #94 GTM94 Yamaha
 21–22 April 2018:  2018 24 Hours of Le Mans Winners:  #5 F.C.C TSR Honda France
 12 May 2018:  2018 8 Hours of Slovakia Ring Winners:  #7 YART Yamaha
 9 June 2018:  2018 Oschersleben 8 Hours Winners:  #5 F.C.C TSR Honda France
 29 July 2018:  2018 Suzuka 8 Hours (final) Winners:  #5 F.C.C TSR Honda France

2018 Superbike World Championship
 February 24 & 25: #1 in  Phillip Island
 Winners:  Marco Melandri ( Aruba.it Racing – Ducati) (2 times)
 March 24 & 25: #2 in  Buriram
 Winners: Race #1:  Jonathan Rea ( Kawasaki Racing Team WorldSBK) / Race #2:  Chaz Davies ( Aruba.it Racing – Ducati)
 April 14 & 15: #3 in  Aragón
 Winners: Race #1:  Jonathan Rea ( Kawasaki Racing Team WorldSBK) / Race #2:  Chaz Davies ( Aruba.it Racing – Ducati)
 April 21 & 22: #4 in  Assen
 Winners: Race #1:  Jonathan Rea ( Kawasaki Racing Team WorldSBK) / Race #2:  Tom Sykes ( Kawasaki Racing Team WorldSBK)
 May 12 & 13: #5 in  Imola
 Winners:  Michael van der Mark ( Pata Yamaha Official WorldSBK Team) (2 times)
 May 26 & 27: #6 in  Donington
 Winners:  Jonathan Rea ( Kawasaki Racing Team WorldSBK) (2 times)
 June 9 & 10: #7 in  Brno
 Winners: Race #1:  Jonathan Rea ( Kawasaki Racing Team WorldSBK) / Race #2:  Alex Lowes ( Pata Yamaha Official WorldSBK Team)
 June 23 & 24: #8 in  Laguna Seca
 Winners:  Jonathan Rea ( Kawasaki Racing Team WorldSBK) (2 times)
 July 7 & 8: #9 in  Misano
 Winners:  Jonathan Rea ( Kawasaki Racing Team WorldSBK) (2 times)
 September 15 & 16: #10 in  Algarve
 Winners:  Jonathan Rea ( Kawasaki Racing Team WorldSBK) (2 times)
 September 29 & 30: #11 in  Magny-Cours
 Winners:  Jonathan Rea ( Kawasaki Racing Team WorldSBK) (2 times)
 October 13 & 14: #12 in  Villicum
 Winners:  Jonathan Rea ( Kawasaki Racing Team WorldSBK) (2 times)
 October 27 & 28: #13 in  Losail (final)
 Winner: Race #1:  Jonathan Rea ( Kawasaki Racing Team WorldSBK) / Race #2: cancelled

Rallying

2018 World Rally Championship
 January 25 – 28:  2018 Monte Carlo Rally Winner:  Sébastien Ogier ( M-Sport Ford World Rally Team)
 February 15 – 18:  2018 Rally Sweden Winner:  Thierry Neuville ( Hyundai Shell Mobis WRT)
 March 8 – 11:  2018 Rally Mexico Winner:  Sébastien Ogier ( M-Sport Ford World Rally Team)
 April 5 – 8:  2018 Tour de Corse Winner:  Sébastien Ogier ( M-Sport Ford World Rally Team)
 April 26 – 29:  2018 Rally Argentina Winner:  Ott Tänak ( Toyota Gazoo Racing WRT)
 May 16 – 20:  2018 Rally de Portugal Winner:  Thierry Neuville ( Hyundai Shell Mobis WRT)
 June 7 – 10:  2018 Rally d'Italia Winner:  Thierry Neuville ( Hyundai Shell Mobis WRT)
 July 26 – 29:  2018 Rally Finland Winner:  Ott Tänak ( Toyota Gazoo Racing WRT)
 August 16 – 19:  2018 Rallye Deutschland Winner:  Ott Tänak ( Toyota Gazoo Racing WRT)
 September 13 – 16:  2018 Rally of Turkey Winner:  Ott Tänak ( Toyota Gazoo Racing WRT)
 October 4 – 7:  2018 Wales Rally GB Winner:  Sébastien Ogier ( M-Sport Ford World Rally Team)
 October 25 – 28:  2018 Rally de España Winner:  Sébastien Ogier ( M-Sport Ford World Rally Team)
 November 15 – 18:  2018 Rally Australia Winner:  Jari-Matti Latvala ( Toyota Gazoo Racing WRT)

Dakar Rally
 Cars winner:  Carlos Sainz (Peugeot)
 Bikes winner:  Matthias Walkner (KTM)
 Quads winner:  Ignacio Casale (Yamaha)
 Trucks winner:  Eduard Nikolaev (Kamaz)
 UTVs winner:  Reinaldo Varela (Can-Am)

Muay Thai

Multi-sport events
 February 9 – 25: 2018 Winter Olympics in  Pyeongchang
  &  won 14 Olympic gold medals each. 
 Norway won the overall medal tally and took first place, due to winning more silver medals than Germany.
 March 9 – 18: 2018 Winter Paralympics in  Pyeongchang
  won both the gold and overall medal tallies.
 March 18 – 24: 2018 Arctic Winter Games in  Fort Smith-Hay River
  Alaska won the gold medal tally.  Alberta North won the overall medal tally.
 April 4 – 15: 2018 Commonwealth Games in  Gold Coast, Queensland
  won both the gold and overall medal tallies.
 May 26 – June 8: 2018 South American Games in  Cochabamba
  won both the gold and overall medal tallies.
 June 22 – July 1: 2018 Mediterranean Games in  Tarragona
  won both the gold and overall medal tallies.
 July 15 – 27: 2018 Micronesian Games in  Yap
  won the gold medal tally. Palau and  Pohnpei won 70 overall medals each.
 July 18 – 28: 2018 African Youth Games in  Algiers
  won both the gold and overall medal tallies.
 July 19 – August 3: 2018 Central American and Caribbean Games in  Barranquilla
 Note: These Games were supposed to be held in Quetzaltenango, but CACSO stripped away the hosting rights from there.
  won both the gold and overall medal tallies.
 August 2 – 12: 2018 European Championships in  Berlin and  Glasgow (debut event)
  won the gold medal tally.  won the overall medal tally.
 August 4 – 12: 2018 Gay Games in  Paris
 For detailed results, click here.
 August 18 – September 2: 2018 Asian Games in  Jakarta and Palembang
  won both the gold and overall medal tallies.
 September 7 – 15: 2018 Asia Pacific Masters Games in / Penang (debut event)
 For information about the sport, click here. From there, the results of that sport would be listed in the "Result" tab.
 October 6 – 13: 2018 Asian Para Games in  Jakarta
  won both the gold and overall medal tallies.
 October 6 – 18: 2018 Summer Youth Olympics in  Buenos Aires
  won both the gold and overall medal tallies.
 November 2 – 11: 2018 Pan Pacific Masters Games in  Gold Coast
 For detailed results, click here. (Choose a sport first and go to the results tab there.)

Netball

 Round Robin Final Ranking: 1st.  Australia, 2nd.  England, 3rd.  New Zealand, 4th.  South Africa
 March 21 – 24: Taini Jamison Trophy in  Auckland
 In the final,  Jamaica defeated  New Zealand, 59–53, to win their 1st title.  Malawi took third place and  Fiji took fourth place.
 June 9 – 13: Namibia Quad Series in 
 Round Robin Final Ranking: 1st.  Namibia, 2nd.  Zimbabwe, 3rd.  Zambia, 4th.  Botswana
 Round Robin Final Ranking: 1st.  Australia, 2nd.  England, 3rd.  New Zealand, 4th.  South Africa
 October 14 & 18: 2018 Constellation Cup
  Australia defeated  New Zealand, 3–1 in games played, to win their 8th Constellation Cup title.

Europe
 March 2 – 4: U17 European Netball Championships in 
  This event is cancelled and rescheduled in October.
 May 10 – 13: Netball Europe Open – Challenge Section in 
 Round Robin Final Ranking: 1st.  Ireland, 2nd.  Isle of Man, 3rd.  United Arab Emirates, 4th.  Gibraltar, 5th.  Israel
 October 5 – 7: Netball Europe Championships – U21 in TBD place

World events
 September 17 – 21: 3rd World University Netball Championship in  Kampala
 In the final,  Uganda defeated  South Africa, 44–43, to win their 1st title.

Nordic combined

Orienteering

Pickleball
 July 20: Bainbridge Cup held in Montesilvano, Italy, played concurrently with the Italian Open Pickleball Championships
 November 2 – 11: 2018 Margaritaville USA Pickleball National Championships in Indian Wells, California

Racquetball

Real tennis
 April 22–28:  2018 Real Tennis World Championship at Queen's Club, London
  Robert Fahey defeated  Camden Riviere 7 sets to 5

Roller sports

World and Continental Championships
 July 15 – 22: 2018 CERH European Championship in  A Coruña
 In the final,  defeated , 6–3, to win the 17th the title.  took third and  took fourth place.
 2018 CERH European U-20 Roller Hockey Championship in 
 2018 Latin Cup in 
 CERH Women's Euro 2018
 October 1 – 10: 1st World University Roller Sports Championships in  Taipei

Artistic
 August 31 – September 8: Junior/Senior/Cadet/Youth European Championships in 
 October 29 – November 3: Cup of Europe in 

Speed
 August 17 – 19: 2018 European Speed Skating Championship in  Ostend
Track
 Seniors 300 m Sprint winners:  Simon Albrecht (m) /  Sandrine Tas (f)
 10000 m Points elimination winners:  Daniel Niero (m) /  Francesca Lollobrigida (f)
 500 m Sprint team winners:  (Ioseba Fernandez & Patxi Peula) (m) /  (Francesca Lollobrigida, Giorgia Bormida, Benedetta Rossini)
 15000 m Eliminations winners:  Daniel Niero (m) /  Francesca Lollobrigida (f)
 500 m Sprint winners:  Simon Albrecht (m) /  Sandrine Tas (f)
 1000 m Sprint winners:  Mathias Vosté (m) /  Sandrine Tas (f)
 3000 m Relay winners:  (Daniel Niero, Duccio Marsili, Daniele Di Stefano, Giuseppe Bramante) (m) /  (Sandrine Tas, Anke Vos, Stien Vanhoutte)
Road
 200 m Sprint winners:  Ioseba Fernández (m) /  Sandrine Tas (f)
 10000 m Points winners:  Daniel Niero (m) /  Sandrine Tas (f)
 20000 m Elimination winners:  Patxi Peula (m) / /  Francesca Lollobrigida (f)
 Seniors one lap winners:  Ioseba Fernández (m) /  Sandrine Tas (f)
Marathon
 Seniors Marathon winners:  Bart Swings (m) /  Chloe Geoffroy (f)

Freestyle
 September 28 – 30: CERS European Freestyle Skating Championships in  Barcelona

Inline Hockey
 April 5 – 8: 2018 Men European League (final in  Rethel)
 In final,  Rethel Ardennes defeated  HC Milano Quanta, 9–2, to win the title.  IHC Berounští Medvědi took third and  Norton Cyclones SHC took fourth place.
 April 26 – 29: 2018 Women European League (final in  Roana)
 In final,  CPLV Panteras defeated  Les Phénix de Ris-Orangis, 3–2, to win the title.  HCR Cent Patins took third and  Taurus Buja Hockey Club took fourth place.
 July 5 – 8: U18M and U16M European Championships in 
 U18: In the final,  defeated , 8–0, to win the title.  took third and  took fourth place.
 U16: In the final,  defeated , 7–3, to win the title.  took third and  took fourth place.

CERH
 November 4, 2017 – May 13: 2017–18 CERH European League (final four in )
 In the final,  FC Barcelona Hoquei defeated  FC Porto, 4–2, to win their 22nd title.
 November 4, 2017 – April 29: 2017–18 CERS Cup (final four in )
 In the final,  CE Lleida Llista Blava defeated  Óquei Clube de Barcelos, 1–0, after penalties to win their 3rd title. Initial match finished 2–2.
 November 11, 2017 – March 18: 2017–18 CERH Women's European League (final four in )
 In the final,  CP Gijón Solimar defeated  S.L. Benfica, 4–3, to win their 5th title.

Rowing

Rugby league
 January 27 – August 25: 2018 Challenge Cup
  Catalans Dragons  defeated  Warrington Wolves, 20–14, to win their 1st Challenge Cup title.
 June 6 – July 11: 2018 State of Origin series
  New South Wales defeated  Queensland, 2 matches out of 3, to win their 14th State of Origin series title.

Rugby sevens

Rugby union

Sailing

Sambo

Shooting sports

World and continental shooting events
 February 16 – 26: 2018 10m European Shooting Championships in  Győr
  won both the gold and overall medal tallies.
 March 14 – 18: 2018 World University Shooting Championship in  Kuala Lumpur
  won the gold medal tally.  won the overall medal tally.
 May 1–12: 2018 World Shooting Para Sport Championships in  Cheongju
 For results, click here.
 May 29 – June 7: 2018 CISM World Military Shooting Championship in  Thun
  won both the gold and overall medal tallies.
 July 30 – August 13: 2018 European Shotgun Championship in  Leobersdorf
 Senior & Junior:  won both the gold and overall medal tallies. 
 September 2 – 14: 2018 ISSF World Shooting Championships in  Changwon
  won the gold medal tally.  won the overall medal tally.
 November 1 – 11: 2018 Shooting Championship of the Americas in  Guadalajara
  won both the gold and overall medal tallies.

2018 ISSF World Cup
 March 2 – 12: All Guns World Cup #1 in  Guadalajara
 10 m Air Pistol winners:  Shahzar Rizvi (m) /  Manu Bhaker (f)
 10 m Air Pistol mixed team winners:  (Om Prakash Mitharval & Manu Bhaker)
 Men's 25 m Rapid Fire Pistol winner:  Clement Bessaguet
 Women's 25 m Pistol winner:  Anna Korakaki
 10 m Air Rifle winners:  István Péni (m) /  Laura-Georgeta Coman (f)
 50 m Rifle Three Positions winners:  Akhil Sheoran (m) /  PEI Ruijiao (f)
 10 m Air Rifle mixed team winners:  (XU Hong & CHEN Keduo)
 Skeet winners:  Vincent Hancock (m) /  Kim Rhode (f)
 Trap winners:  Lyndon Sosa (m) /  Ashley Carroll (f)
 Trap mixed team winners:  (Satu Mäkelä-Nummela & Vesa Tornroos)
 March 19 – 29: 2018 Junior World Cup (All Guns) #1 in  Sydney
 Junior 10 m Air Pistol winners:  WANG Zhehao (m) /  Manu Bhaker (f)
 Men's Junior 25 m Rapid Fire Pistol winner:  Anish Anish
 Women's Junior 25 m Pistol winner:  Muskan Muskan
 Junior 10 m Air Pistol Mixed Team winners:  (Anmol Anmol & Manu Bhaker)
 Junior 10 m Air Rifle winners:  LIU Yuqi (m) /  Elavenil Valarivan (f)
 Men's Junior 50 m Rifle Three Positions winner:  ZHANG Changhong
 Junior 10 m Air Rifle Mixed Team winners:  (ZHU Yingjie & LIU Yuqi)
 Junior Trap winners:  Matteo Marongiu (m) /  DUAN Yuwei (f)
 Junior Skeet winners:  DOU Xuyang (m) /  Aislin Jones (f)
 Junior Trap Mixed Team winners:  (Teo Petroni & Erica Sessa)
 April 20 – 30: All Guns World Cup #2 (final) in  Changwon
 10 m Air Pistol winners:  Artem Chernousov (m) /  Viktoria Chaika (f)
 10 m Air Pistol Mixed Team winners:  (JI Xiaojing & WU Jiayu)
 Men's 25 m Rapid Fire Pistol winner:  Kim Jun-hong
 Women's 25 m Pistol winner:  Elena Galiabovitch
 10 m Air Rifle winners:  Alexander Dryagin (m) /  ZHAO Ruozhu (f)
 10 m Air Rifle Mixed Team winners:  (ZHAO Ruozhu & Yang Haoran)
 50 m Rifle Three Positions winners:  Sergey Kamenskiy (m) /  WANG Zeru (f)
 Trap winners:  Mauro de Filippis (m) /  Satu Mäkelä-Nummela (f)
 Mixed Trap winners:  (Erik Varga & Zuzana Štefečeková)
 Skeet winners:  Vincent Hancock (m) /  Kim Rhode (f)
 May 7 – 15: Rifle and Pistol World Cup #1 in  Fort Benning
 10 m Air Pistol winners:  WU Jiayu (m) /  Anna Korakaki (f)
 10 m Air Pistol Mixed Team winners:  (Pablo Carrera & Sonia Franquet)
 Men's 25 m Rapid Fire Pistol winner:  LIN Junmin
 Women's 25 m Pistol winner:  Maria Grozdeva
 10 m Air Rifle winners:  Julian Justus (m) /  WU Mingyang (f)
 10 m Air Rifle Mixed Team winners:  (WU Mingyang & YAO Yuncong)
 50 m Rifle Three Positions winners:  István Péni (m) /  Snježana Pejčić (f)
 May 22 – 29: Rifle and Pistol World Cup #2 (final) in  Munich
 10 m Air Pistol winners:  Oleh Omelchuk (m) /  Olena Kostevych (f)
 10 m Air Pistol Mixed Team winners:  (Olena Kostevych & Oleh Omelchuk)
 Men's 25 m Rapid Fire Pistol winner:  LIN Junmin
 Women's 25 m Pistol winner:  XIONG Yaxuan
 10 m Air Rifle winners:  Illia Charheika (m) /  LIN Ying-Shin (f)
 10 m Air Rifle Mixed Team winners:  (Anastasiia Galashina & Sergey Kamenskiy)
 50 m Rifle Three Positions winners:  Yang Haoran (m) /  Elaheh Ahmadi (f)
 June 5 – 15: Shotgun World Cup #1 in  Siġġiewi
 Skeet winners:  Vincent Hancock (m) /  Amber Hill (f)
 Trap winners:  Aaron Heading (m) /  Satu Mäkelä-Nummela (f)
 Mixed Trap winners:  (Erik Varga & Zuzana Štefečeková)
 June 22 – 29: 2018 Junior World Cup (All Guns) #2 (final) in  Suhl
 Junior 10 m Air Pistol winners:  Chaudhary Saurabh (m) /  Manu Bhaker (f)
 Junior 10 m Air Pistol Mixed Team winners:  (Devanshi Rana & Chaudhary Saurabh)
 Junior 25 m Pistol winners:  Ernests Erbs (m) /  Camille Jedrzejewski (f)
 Junior 25 m Standard Pistol winners  Vijayveer Sidhu (m) /  Vishwa Jignesh Dahiya (f)
 Junior 50 m Pistol winners:  Mikhail Isakov (m) /  Yulyana Rohach (f)
 Junior Men's 25 m Rapid Fire Pistol winner:  Matej Rampula
 Junior 10 m Air Rifle winners:  Hriday Hazarika (m) /  Elavenil Valarivan (f)
 Junior 10 m Air Rifle Mixed Team winners:  (Elavenil Valarivan & Divyansh Singh Panwar)
 Junior 50 m Rifle Prone winners:  William Shaner (m) /  Morgan Phillips (f)
 Junior 50 m Rifle Three Positions winners:  Marco Suppini (m) /  WANG Zeru (f)
 Junior Skeet winners:  Emil Kjelgaard Petersen (m) /  Vanesa Hockova (f)
 Junior Trap winners:  Adria Martinez Torres (m) /  Gaia Ragazzini (f)
 Junior Trap Mixed Team winners:  (Erica Sessa & Teo Petroni)
 July 9 – 19: Shotgun World Cup #2 (final) in  Tucson, Arizona
 Skeet winners:  LEE Jong-jun (m) /  Kim Rhode (f)
 Trap winners:  Simone Lorenzo Prosperi (m) /  Marika Salmi (f)
 Mixed Trap winners:  (Corey Cogdell & Casey Wallace)

Ski jumping

Snooker

Snowboarding

Softball

WBSC
 February 1 – 4: 2018 Asia-Pacific Softball Cup in  Blacktown
  defeated , 3–0, in the final.  took third place.
 April 23 – 28: 2018 Asian Men's Softball Championship in  Jakarta
  defeated , 4–0, to win their seventh consecutive and eighth overall Asian Men's Softball Championship title.
  took third place.
 May 13 – 18: 2018 Asian Junior Women's Softball Championship in  Pampanga
  defeated  to win their fourth Asian Junior Women's Softball Championship title.
  took third place.
 June 12 – 15: 2018 East Asian Women's Softball Cup in  Nantou City
  defeated , 7–3, in the final. 
  took third place.
 June 25 – 30: 2018 European Men's Softball Championship in  Havlíčkův Brod
 Champions: ; Second: ; Third: 
 July 7 – 15: 2018 Junior Men's Softball World Championship in  Prince Albert
  defeated , 6–1, to win their fifth Junior Men's Softball World Championship title.
  took third place.
 July 16 – 21: 2018 European U19 Women's Softball Championship in  Staranzano
  defeated , 7–3, in the final.  took third place.
 July 23 – 28: 2018 European U22 Women's Softball Championship in  Trnava
  defeated , 5–4, in the final.  took third place.
 August 2 – 12: 2018 Women's Softball World Championship in  Chiba
 The  defeated , 7–6, to win their second consecutive and eleventh overall Women's Softball World Championship title.
  took the bronze medal.
 Note: The United States has qualified to compete at the 2020 Summer Olympics.
 October 26 & 27: 2018 Asian University Women's Softball Championship in  Nanjing

Little League Softball World Series
 July 29 – August 4: 2018 Junior League Softball World Series in  Kirkland at Everest Park
 The  Snow Canyon Little League (USA West) defeated the  Smithville Little League (USA Southwest), 9–3, in the final.
 July 30 – August 5: 2018 Senior League Softball World Series in  Roxana at Lower Sussex Little League Complex
 Team  Tanauan (Asia-Pacific) defeated team  Waco (USA Southwest), 7–0, in the final.
 August 8 – 15: 2018 Little League Softball World Series in  Portland at Alpenrose Stadium
 Team  Wheelersburg LL (Central) defeated team  Tunkhannock LL (East), 3–0, in the final.

Speed skating

Sport climbing

Squash

Surfing

Table tennis

Taekwondo

Telemark skiing

Tennis

Triathlon

Volleyball

Water polo

Weightlifting

Wrestling

Wushu

References

 
Sports by year